= List of carnivorous plants =

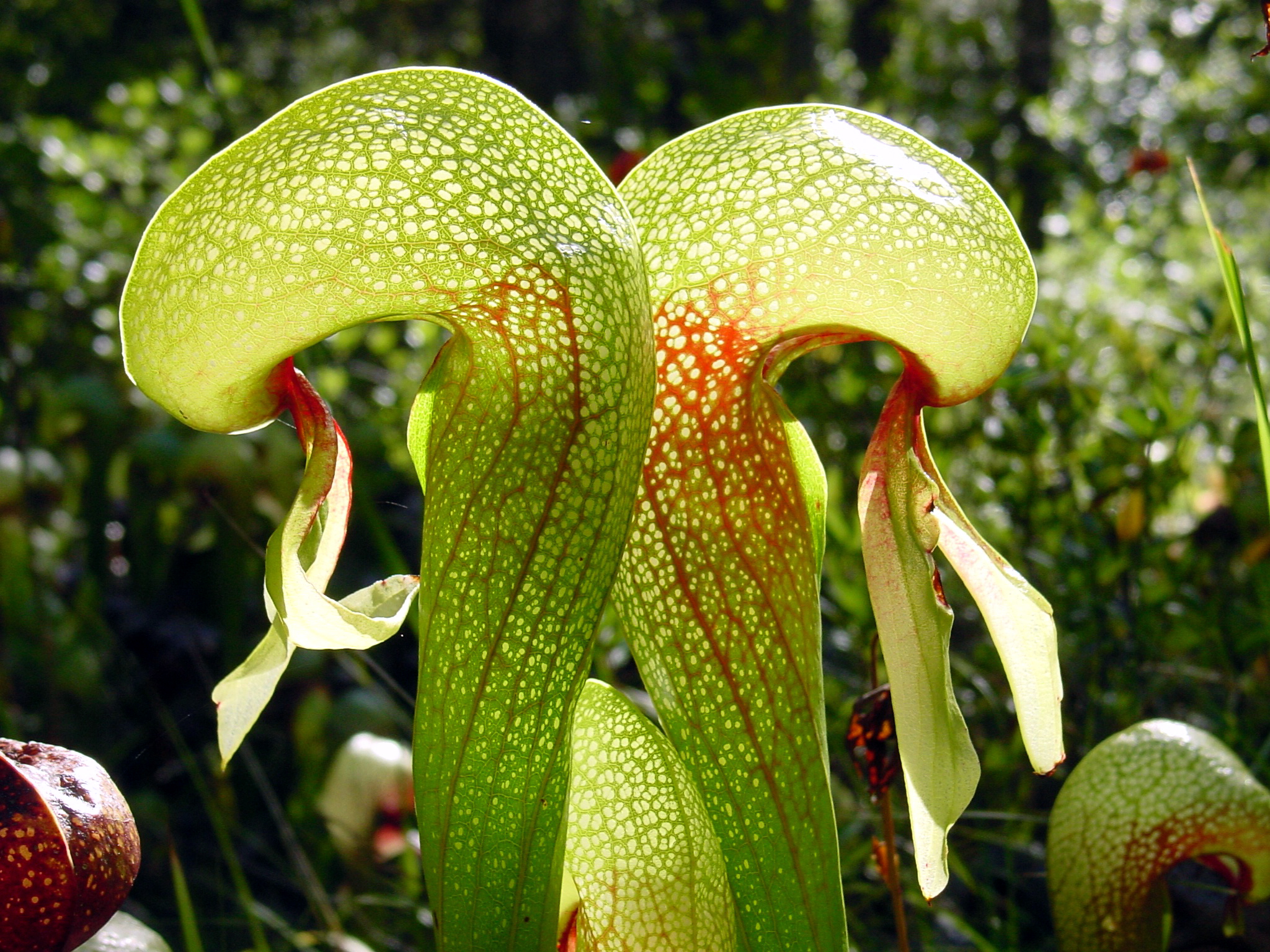
Darlingtonia californica is a carnivorous plant, the sole member of the genus Darlingtonia in the family Sarraceniaceae.

This list of carnivorous plants is a comprehensive listing of all known carnivorous plant species, of which more than 750 are currently recognised. Unless otherwise stated it is based on Jan Schlauer's Carnivorous Plant Database. Extinct taxa are denoted with a dagger (†).

Some of the species on this list may not satisfy certain strict definitions of plant carnivory, and could alternatively be characterised as merely paracarnivorous or protocarnivorous.

== Extant species ==
=== Aldrovanda ===
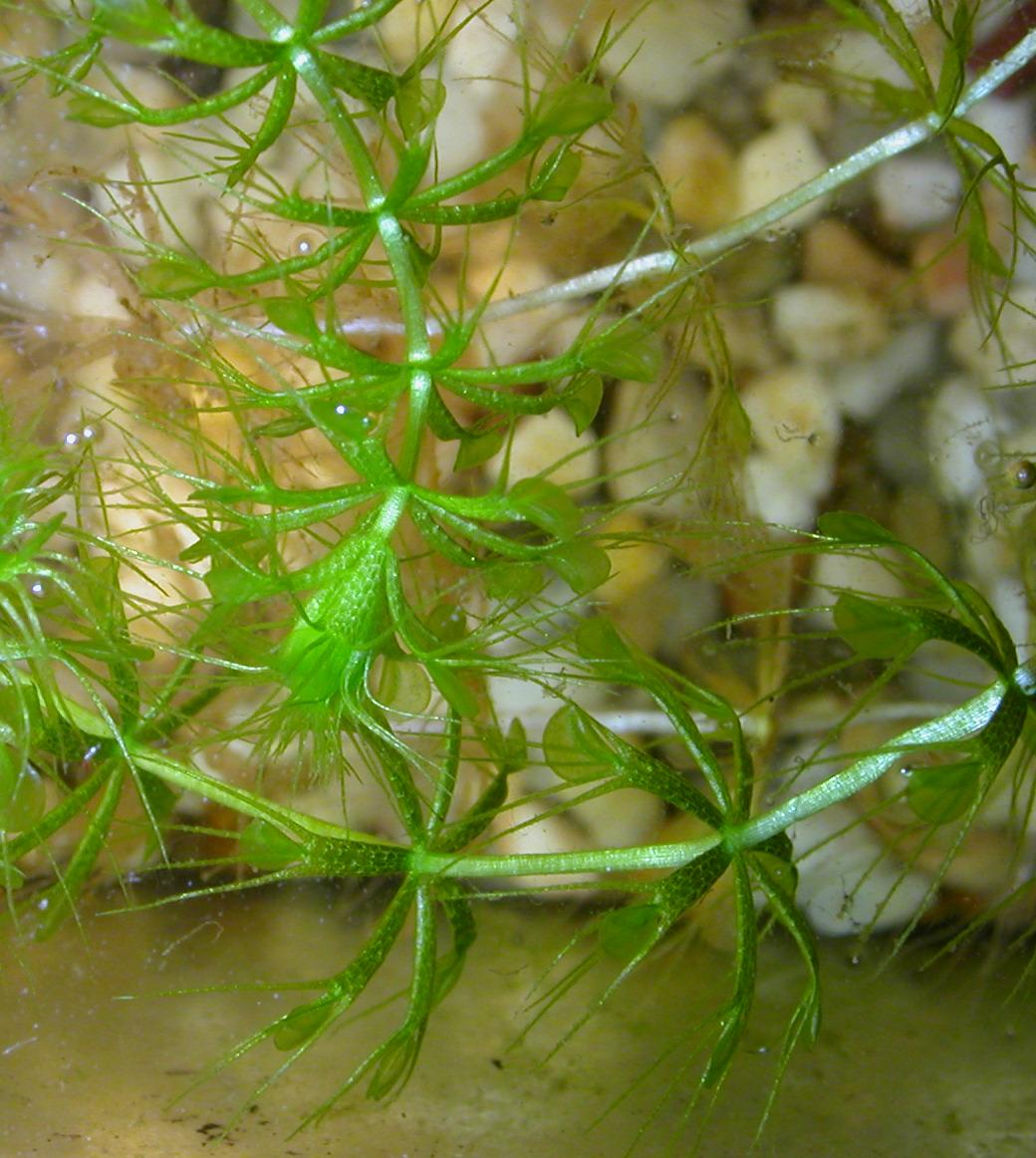
Aldrovanda vesiculosa

This genus contains a single extant species.

- Aldrovanda vesiculosa L., 1753

=== Brocchinia ===
This genus contains around 20 extant species, of which at least two are thought to be carnivorous.

- Brocchinia hechtioides Mez, 1913
- Brocchinia reducta Baker, 1882

=== Byblis ===
The following list of 8 species is based on Carnivorous Plants of Australia Magnum Opus (2013).

- Byblis aquatica Lowrie & Conran, 1998
- Byblis filifolia Planch., 1848
- Byblis gigantea Lindl., 1839
- Byblis guehoi Lowrie & Conran, 2008
- Byblis lamellata Lowrie & Conran, 2002
- Byblis liniflora Salisb., 1808
- Byblis pilbarana Lowrie & Conran, 2013
- Byblis rorida Lowrie & Conran, 1998

=== Catopsis ===
This genus contains around 20 extant species, of which at least one is thought to be carnivorous.

- Catopsis berteroniana Mez, 1896

=== Cephalotus ===
This genus contains a single extant species.

- Cephalotus follicularis Labill., 1806

=== Darlingtonia ===
This genus contains a single extant species.

- Darlingtonia californica Torr., 1853

=== Dionaea ===
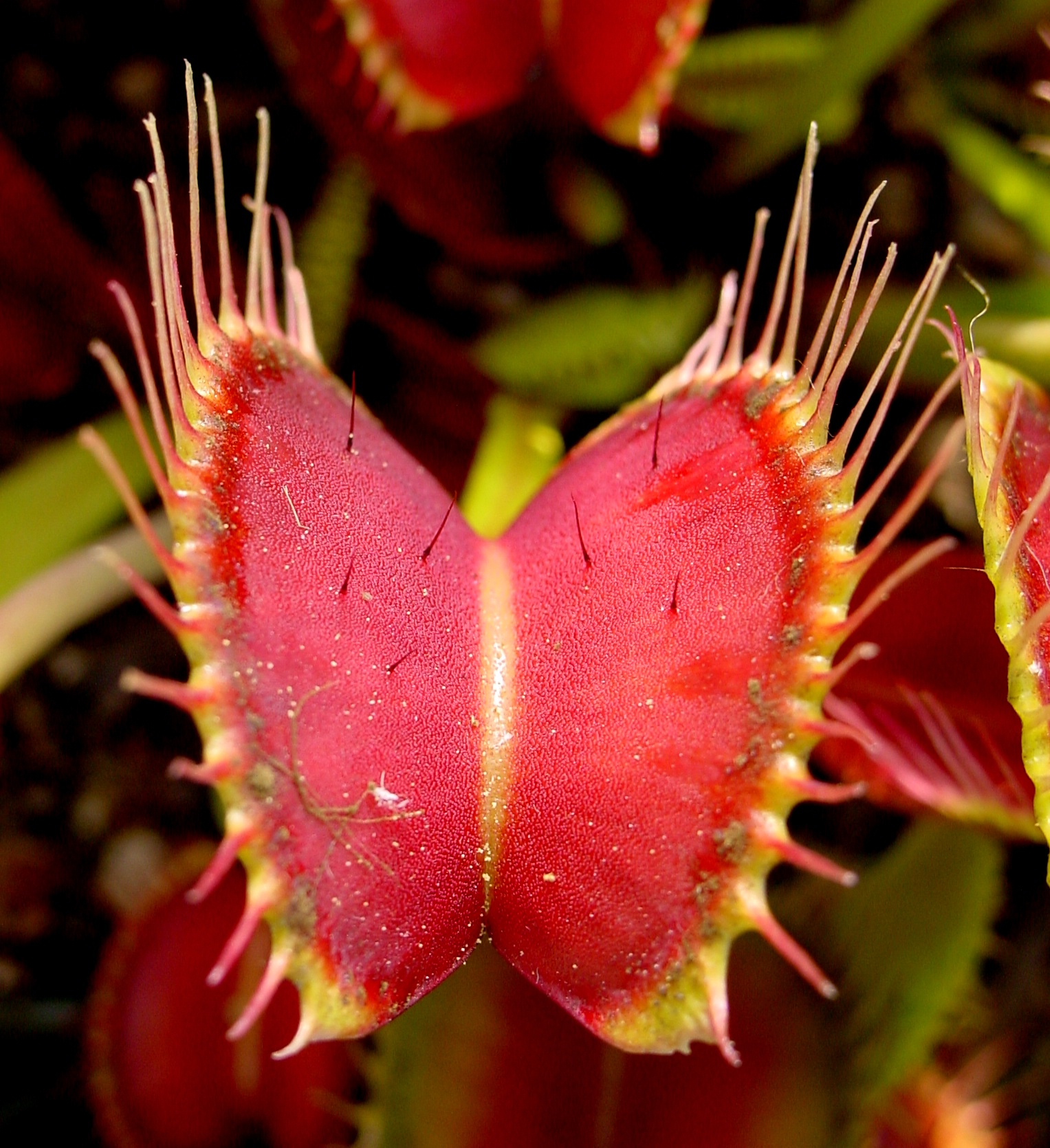
Dionaea muscipula

This genus contains a single extant species.

- Dionaea muscipula Soland. ex Ellis, 1773

=== Drosera ===
There are around 208 species here:

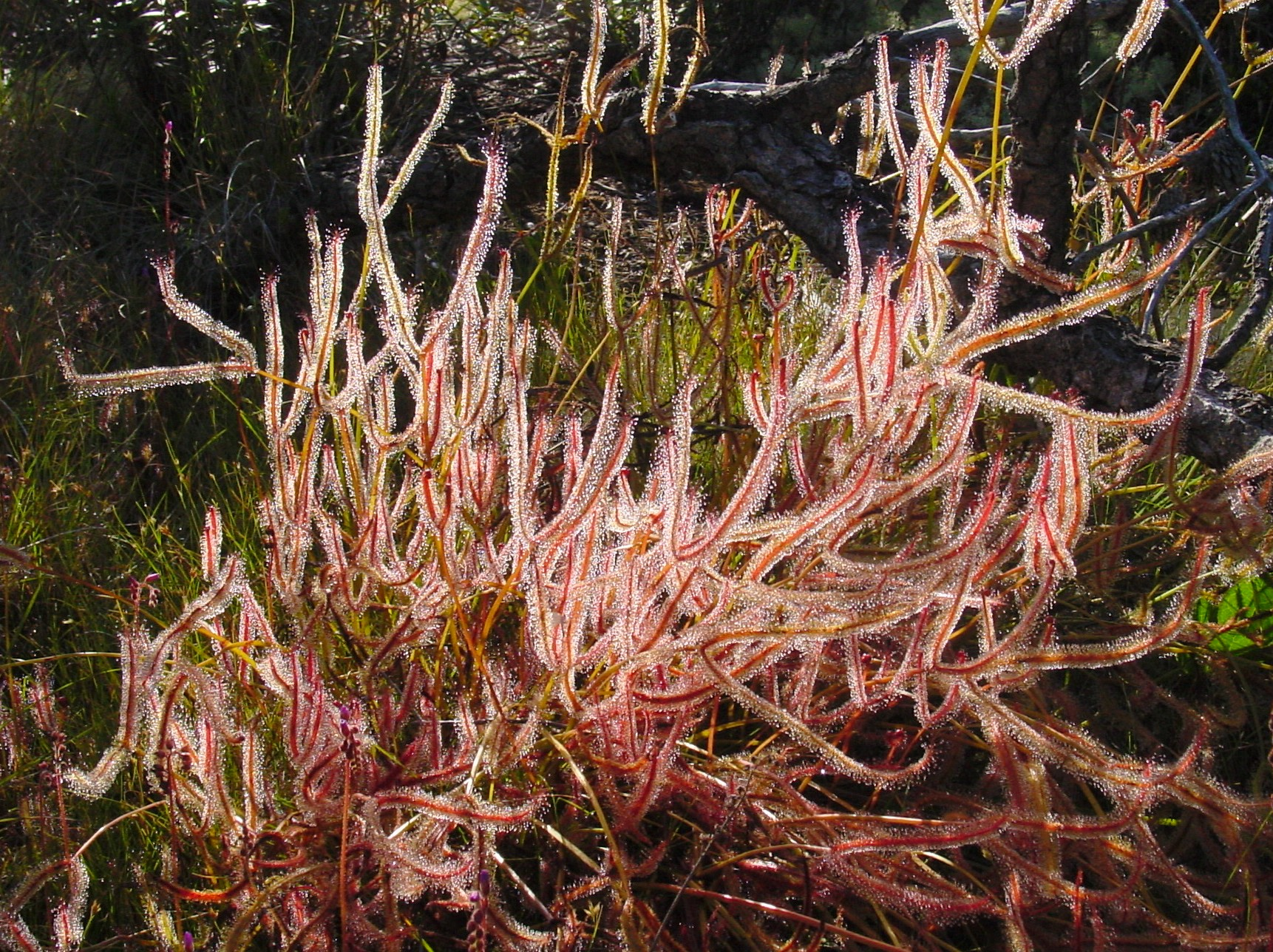
Drosera binata

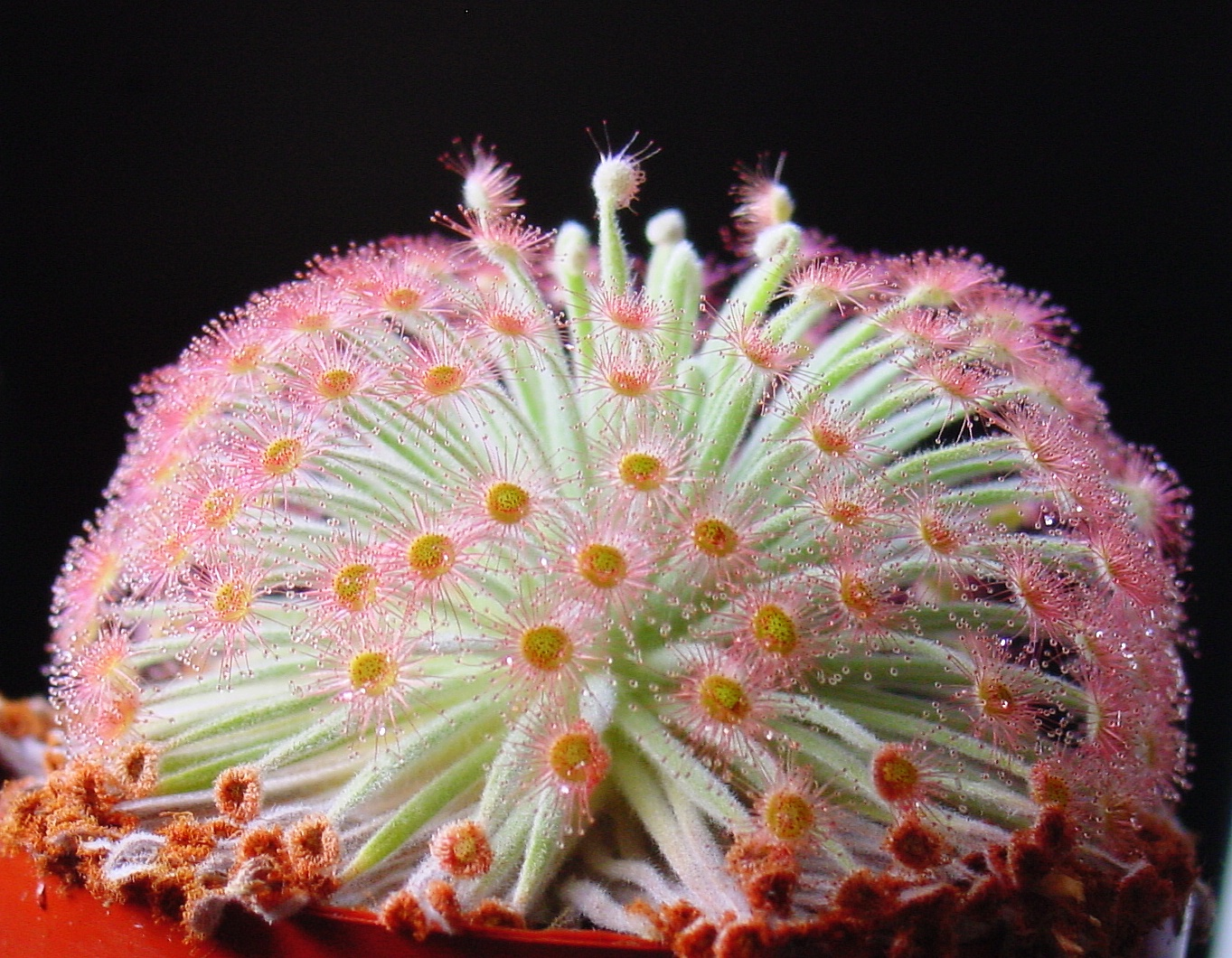
Drosera derbyensis

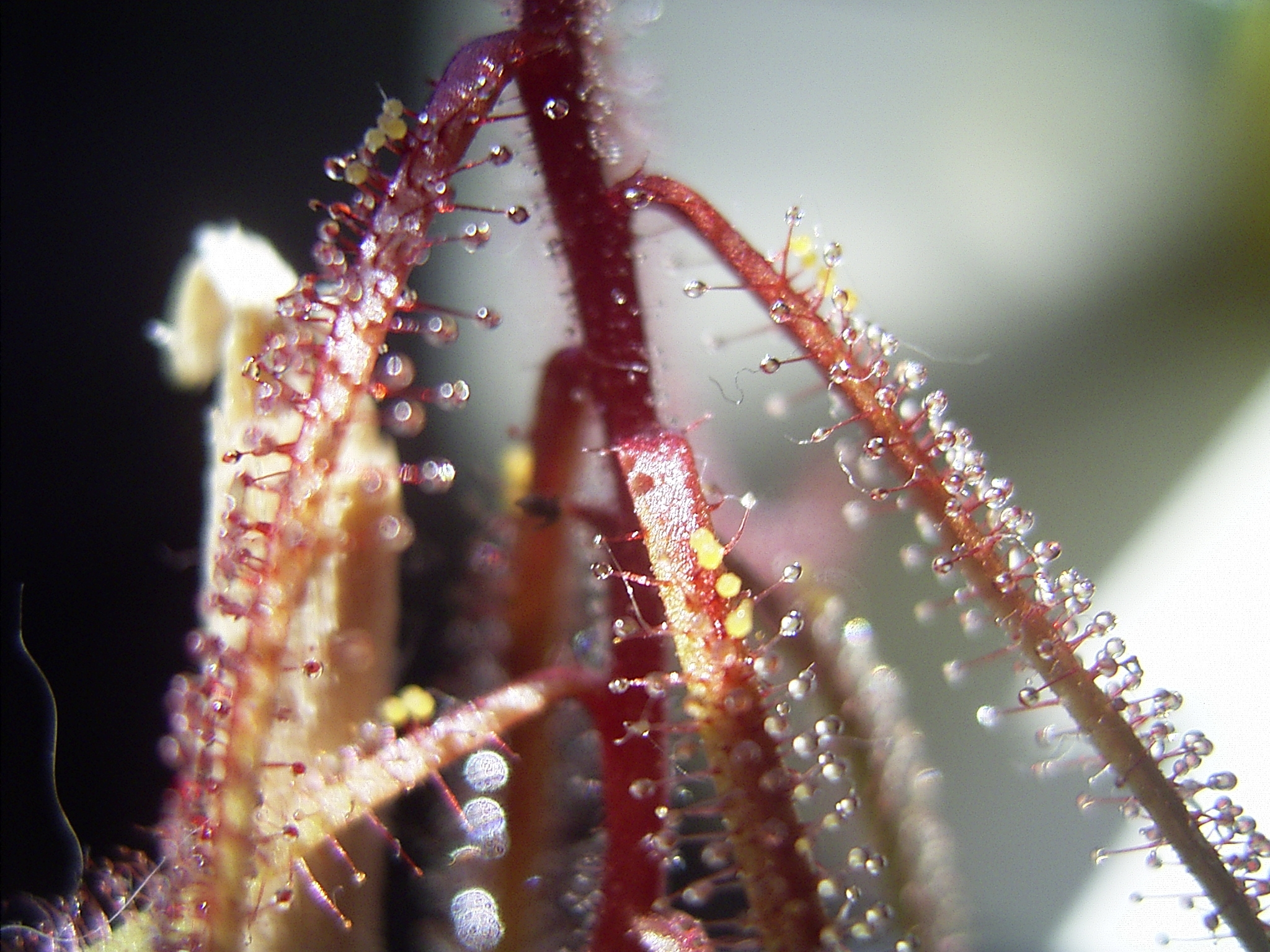
Drosera hartmeyerorum

- Drosera aberrans (Lowrie ex Lowrie & Carlquist) Lowrie & Conran, 2008 (Bas.: Drosera whittakeri subsp. aberrans)
- Drosera acaulis L.f., 1781
- Drosera adelae F.Muell., 1864
- Drosera admirabilis Debbert, 1987
- Drosera affinis Welw. ex Oliv., 1871
- Drosera afra Debbert, 2002
- Drosera alba Phill., 1913
- Drosera albonotata A.S.Rob., A.T.Cross, Meisterl & A.Fleischm., 2018
- Drosera aliciae R.Hamet, 1905
- Drosera allantostigma (N.G.Marchant & Lowrie) Lowrie & Conran, 2007
- Drosera amazonica Rivadavia et al.
- Drosera andersoniana W.Fitzg. ex Ewart. & White, 1909
- Drosera androsacea Diels, 1904
- Drosera anglica Huds., 1778
- Drosera aquatica Lowrie, 2013
- Drosera arachnoides Rakotoar. & A.Fleischm., 2020
- Drosera arcturi Hook., 1834
- Drosera arenicola Steyerm., 1952
- Drosera ascendens A.St.-Hil., 1826
- Drosera atrata T.Krueger, A.Fleischm. & Bourke, 2023
- Drosera atrostyla Debbert, 1991
- Drosera aurantiaca Lowrie, 2013
- Drosera australis (N.G.Marchant & Lowrie) Lowrie & Conran, 2013 (Bas.: Drosera occidentalis subsp. australis)
- Drosera banksii R.Br. ex DC., 1824
- Drosera barbigera Planch., 1848
- Drosera barrettiorum Lowrie, 2013
- Drosera basifolia (N.G.Marchant & Lowrie) Lowrie, 2013 (Bas.: Drosera menziesii subsp. basifolia)
- Drosera bequaertii Taton, 1945
- Drosera bicolor Lowrie & Carlquist, 1992
- Drosera biflora Willd. ex Roem. & Schult., 1820
- Drosera binata Labill., 1804
- Drosera bindoon Lowrie, 2013
- Drosera brevicornis Lowrie, 1996
- Drosera brevifolia Pursh, 1814
- Drosera broomensis Lowrie, 1996
- Drosera browniana Lowrie & N.G.Marchant, 1992
- Drosera bulbigena Morr., 1903
- Drosera bulbosa Hook., 1814
- Drosera burkeana Planch., 1848
- Drosera burmanni Vahl, 1794
- Drosera buubugujin Michael T. Mathieson, 2020
- Drosera caduca Lowrie, 1996
- Drosera callistos N.G.Marchant & Lowrie, 1992
- Drosera calycina Planch., 1848
- Drosera camporupestris F.Rivadavia, 2003
- Drosera capensis L., 1753
- Drosera capillaris Poir., 1804
- Drosera cayennensis Sagot ex Diels, 1906
- Drosera cendeensis Tamayo & Croizat, 1949
- Drosera chimaera Gonella & Rivadavia, 2014
- Drosera chrysolepis Taub., 1893
- Drosera cistiflora L., 1760
- Drosera citrina Lowrie & Carlquist, 1992
- Drosera closterostigma N.G.Marchant & Lowrie, 1992
- Drosera coalara Lowrie & Conran, 2013
- Drosera coccipetala Debbert, 2002
- Drosera collina (N.G.Marchant & Lowrie) Lowrie, 2013 (Bas.: Drosera erythrorhiza subsp. collina)
- Drosera collinsiae Brown ex Burtt Davy, 1924
- Drosera colombiana Fernandez-Perez, 1965
- Drosera communis A.St.-Hil., 1824
- Drosera condor P. Gonella, A. Fleischmann, F. Rivadavia, D. Neill, & P. Sano, 2016
- Drosera coomallo Lowrie & Conran, 2013
- Drosera cucullata Lowrie, 2013
- Drosera cuneifolia L.f., 1781
- Drosera curvipes Planch., 1848
- Drosera darwinensis Lowrie, 1996
- Drosera depauperata Lowrie & Conran, 2013
- Drosera derbyensis Lowrie, 1996
- Drosera dichrosepala Turcz., 1854
- Drosera dielsiana Exell & Laundon, 1956
- Drosera dilatatopetiolaris K.Kondo, 1984
- Drosera drummondii Planch., 1848
- Drosera echinoblastus N.G.Marchant & Lowrie, 1992
- Drosera elongata Exell & Laundon, 1995
- Drosera eneabba N.G.Marchant & Lowrie, 1992
- Drosera enodes N.G.Marchant & Lowrie, 1992
- Drosera eremaea (N.G.Marchant & Lowrie) Lowrie & Conran, 2013 (Bas.: Drosera macrantha subsp. eremaea)
- Drosera ericgreenii A.Fleischm., Gibson & F.Rivadavia, 2008
- Drosera ericksoniae N.G.Marchant & Lowrie, 1992
- Drosera erythrogyne N.G.Marchant & Lowrie, 1992
- Drosera erythrorhiza Lindl., 1839
- Drosera esmeraldae (Steyerm.) Maguire & Wurdack, 1957 (Bas.:Drosera tenella var.esmeraldae)
- Drosera esperensis Lowrie, 2013
- Drosera esterhuyseniae (Salter) Debbert, 1991
- Drosera falconeri Tsang ex K.Kondo, 1984
- Drosera felix Steyerm. & L.B.Smith, 1974
- Drosera filiformis Raf., 1808
- Drosera fimbriata De Buhr, 1975
- Drosera finlaysoniana Wall. ex Arn., 1837
- Drosera flexicaulis Welw. ex Oliv., 1871
- Drosera fragrans Lowrie, 2013
- Drosera fulva Planch., 1848
- Drosera geniculata (N.G.Marchant & Lowrie) Lowrie, 2013 (Bas.: Drosera gigantea subsp. geniculata)
- Drosera gibsonii P.Mann, 2007
- Drosera gigantea Lindl., 1839
- Drosera glabripes (Harv. ex Planch.) Stein, 1886 (Bas.:Drosera ramentacea var. glabripes)
- Drosera glabriscapa Lowrie, 2013
- Drosera glanduligera Lehm., 1844
- Drosera graminifolia A.St.-Hil., 1824
- Drosera graniticola N.G.Marchant, 1982
- Drosera grantsaui Rivadavia, 2003
- Drosera graomogolensis T.Silva, 1997
- Drosera grievei Lowrie & N.G.Marchant, 1992
- Drosera gunniana (Planch.) de Salas, 2018
- Drosera hamiltonii C.R.P.Andrews, 1903
- Drosera hartmeyerorum Schlauer, 2001
- Drosera helodes N.G.Marchant & Lowrie, 1992
- Drosera heterophylla Lindl., 1839
- Drosera hilaris Cham. & Schlechtd., 1826
- Drosera hirsuta Lowrie & Conran, 2013
- Drosera hirtella A.St.-Hil., 1824
- Drosera hirticalyx R.Duno & Culham, 1995
- Drosera hookeri R.P.Gibson, B.J.Conn & Conran, 2010
- Drosera hortiorum T.Krueger & Bourke, 2023
- Drosera huegelii Endl., 1837
- Drosera humbertii Exell & Laundon, 1956
- Drosera humilis Planch., 1848
- Drosera hyperostigma N.G.Marchant & Lowrie, 1992
- Drosera indica L., 1753
- Drosera indumenta Lowrie & Conran, 2013
- Drosera insolita Taton, 1954
- Drosera intermedia Hayne, 1800
- Drosera intricata Planch., 1848
- Drosera kaieteurensis Brumm.-Ding., 1955
- Drosera katangensis Taton, 1945
- Drosera kenneallyi Lowrie, 1996
- Drosera koikyennuruff T.Krueger & A.S.Rob., 2023
- Drosera lanata K.Kondo, 1984
- Drosera lasiantha Lowrie & Carlquist, 1992
- Drosera latifolia (Eichler) Gonella & Rivadavia, 2014
- Drosera leioblastus N.G.Marchant & Lowrie, 1992
- Drosera leucoblasta Benth., 1864
- Drosera leucostigma (N.G.Marchant & Lowrie) Lowrie & Conran, 2007
- Drosera linearis Goldie, 1822
- Drosera lowriei N.G.Marchant, 1992
- Drosera lutescens (A.St.-Hil.) Gonella, Rivadavia & A.Fleischm., 2022
- Drosera maanyaa-gooljoo A.Fleischm. & T.Krueger, 2023
- Drosera macrantha Endl., 1837
- Drosera macropetala (Diels) T.Krueger & A.Fleischm., 2023
- Drosera macrophylla Lindl., 1839
- Drosera madagascariensis DC., 1824
- Drosera magna (N.G.Marchant & Lowrie) Lowrie, 2013 (Bas.: Drosera erythrorhiza subsp. magna)
- Drosera magnifica Rivadavia & Gonella, 2015
- Drosera major (Diels) Lowrie, 2013 (Bas.: Drosera bulbosa var. major)
- Drosera mannii Cheek, 1990
- Drosera marchantii De Buhr, 1975
- Drosera margaritacea T.Krueger & A.Fleischm., 2021
- Drosera menziesii R.Br. ex DC., 1824
- Drosera meristocaulis Maguire & Wurdack, 1957
- Drosera micra Lowrie & Conran, 2013
- Drosera micrantha Lehm., 1844
- Drosera microphylla Endl., 1837
- Drosera miscroscapa Debbert, 1992
- Drosera miniata Diels, 1904
- Drosera minutiflora Planch., 1848
- Drosera modesta Diels, 1904
- Drosera monantha (Lowrie & Carlquist) Lowrie, 2013 (Bas.: Drosera macrophylla subsp. monantha)
- Drosera montana A.St.-Hil., 1824
- Drosera monticola (Lowrie & N.G.Marchant) Lowrie, 2011 (Bas.: Drosera stolonifera subsp. monticola)
- Drosera moorei (Diels) A.Lowrie, 1999 (Bas.: Drosera subhirtella var.moorei)
- Drosera murfetii (Lowrie) Lowrie, 2014
- Drosera myriantha Planch., 1848
- Drosera nana Lowrie, 2013
- Drosera natalensis Diels, 1906
- Drosera neesii Lehm., 1844
- Drosera neocaledonica R.Hamet, 1906
- Drosera nidiformis Debbert, 1991
- Drosera nitidula Planch., 1848
- Drosera nivea Lowrie & Carlquist, 1992
- Drosera oblanceolata Y.Z.Ruan, 1981
- Drosera occidentalis Morr., 1912
- Drosera omissa Diels, 1906
- Drosera orbiculata N.G.Marchant & Lowrie, 1992
- Drosera ordensis Lowrie, 1994
- Drosera oreopodion N.G.Marchant & Lowrie, 1992
- Drosera paleacea DC., 1824
- Drosera pallida Lindl., 1839
- Drosera panamensis Correa & A.S.Taylor, 1976
- Drosera paradoxa Lowrie, 1997
- Drosera parvula Planch., 1848
- Drosera patens Lowrie & Conran, 2007
- Drosera pauciflora Banks ex DC., 1824
- Drosera pedicellaris Lowrie, 2002
- Drosera peltata Thunb., 1797
- Drosera peruensis T.Silva & M.D.Correa,
- Drosera petiolaris R.Br. ex DC., 1824
- Drosera pilosa Exell & Laundon, 1956
- Drosera planchonii Hook.f ex.Planch., 1848
- Drosera platypoda Turcz., 1854
- Drosera platystigma Lehm., 1844
- Drosera porrecta Lehm., 1844
- Drosera praefolia Tepper, 1892
- Drosera prolifera C.T.White, 1940
- Drosera prophylla (N.G.Marchant & Lowrie) Lowrie, 2013 (Bas.: Drosera marchantii subsp. prophylla)
- Drosera prostrata (N.G.Marchant & Lowrie) Lowrie, 2005
- Drosera prostratoscaposa Lowrie & Carlquist, 1990
- Drosera pulchella Lehm., 1844
- Drosera purpurascens Schlotth., 1856
- Drosera pycnoblasta Diels, 1904
- Drosera pygmaea DC., 1824
- Drosera quartzicola Rivadavia & Gonella, 2011
- Drosera radicans N.G.Marchant, 1982
- Drosera ramellosa Lehm., 1844
- Drosera ramentacea Burch. ex DC., 1824
- Drosera rechingeri Strid, 1987
- Drosera reflexa Bourke & A.S.Rob., 2023
- Drosera regia Stephens, 1926
- Drosera riparia Gonella & Rivadavia, 2014
- Drosera roraimae (Klotzsch ex Diels) Maguire & Laundon, 1957 (Bas.: Drosera montana var.roraimae)
- Drosera roseana N.G.Marchant & Lowrie, 1992
- Drosera rosulata Lehm., 1844
- Drosera rotundifolia L., 1753
- Drosera rubricalyx T.Krueger & A.Fleischm., 2023
- Drosera rubrifolia Debbert, 2002
- Drosera rupicola (N.G.Marchant) Lowrie, 2005
- Drosera salina N.G.Marchant & Lowrie, 1992
- Drosera sargentii Lowrie & N.G.Marchant, 1992
- Drosera schizandra Diels, 1906
- Drosera schmutzii Lowrie & Conran, 2008
- Drosera schwackei (Diels) F.Rivadavia, 2008 (Bas.: Drosera montana var. schwackei)
- Drosera scorpioides Planch., 1848
- Drosera serpens Planch., 1848
- Drosera sessilifolia A.St.-Hil., 1824
- Drosera sewelliae Diels, 1904
- Drosera silvicola Lowrie & Carlquist, 1992
- Drosera slackii Cheek, 1987
- Drosera solaris A.Fleischm., Wistuba & S.McPherson, 2007
- Drosera spatulata Labill., 1804
- Drosera spilos N.G.Marchant & Lowrie, 1992
- Drosera spiralis A.St.-Hil., 1826
- Drosera spirocalyx Rivadavia & Gonella, 2014
- Drosera squamosa Benth., 1864
- Drosera stelliflora Lowrie & Carlquist, 1992
- Drosera stenopetala Hook.f., 1853
- Drosera stipularis Baleeiro, R.W.Jobson & R.L.Barrett, 2020
- Drosera stolonifera Endl., 1837
- Drosera stricticaulis (Diels) O.H.Sargent, 1913 (Bas.: Drosera macrantha var.stricticaulis)
- Drosera subhirtella Planch., 1848
- Drosera subtilis N.G.Marchant, 1982
- Drosera sulphurea Lehm., 1884
- Drosera tentaculata F.Rivadavia, 2003
- Drosera tokaiensis (Komiya & C.Shibata) T.Nakam. & K.Ueda, 1991 (Bas.: Drosera spatulata subsp. tokaiensis)
- Drosera tomentosa A.St.-Hil., 1824
- Drosera trichocaulis (Diels) Lowrie & Conran, 2013 (Bas.: Drosera paleacea var. trichocaulis)
- Drosera trinervia Spreng., 1820
- Drosera tubaestylis N.G.Marchant & Lowrie, 1992
- Drosera ultramafica A.Fleischm., A.S.Rob. & S.McPherson, 2011
- Drosera uniflora Willd., 1809
- Drosera venusta P.Debbert, 1987
- Drosera verrucata Lowrie & Conran, 2013
- Drosera villosa A.St.-Hil., 1824
- Drosera viridis F.Rivadavia, 2003
- Drosera walyunga N.G.Marchant & Lowrie, 1992
- Drosera whittakeri Planch, 1848
- Drosera xerophila A.Fleischm., 2018
- Drosera yilgarnensis R.P.Gibson & B.J.Conn, 2012
- Drosera yutajensis R.Duno & Culham, 1995
- Drosera zeyheri T.M.Salter, 1940
- Drosera zigzagia A.Lowrie, 1999
- Drosera zonaria Planch., 1848

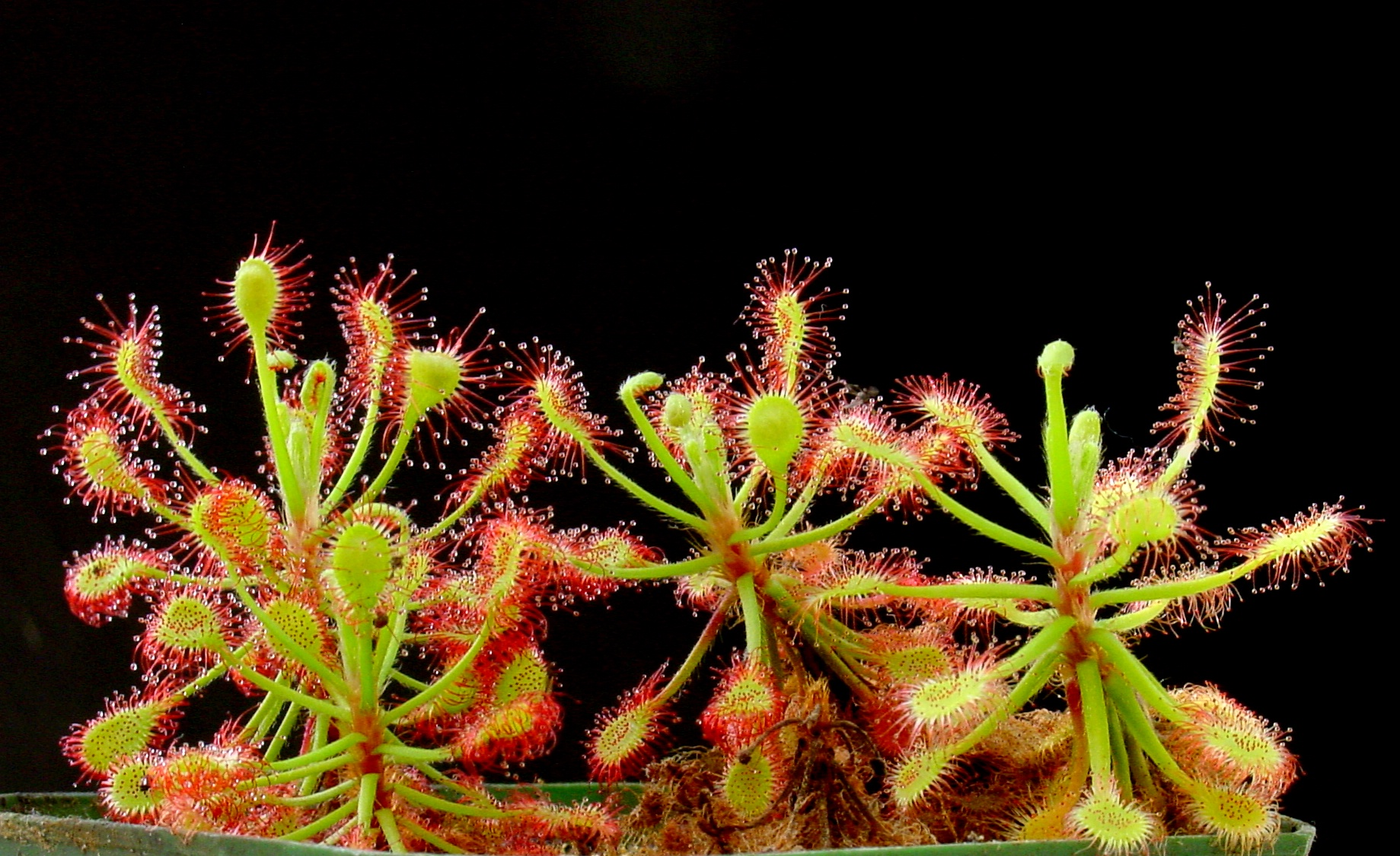
Drosera madagascariensis

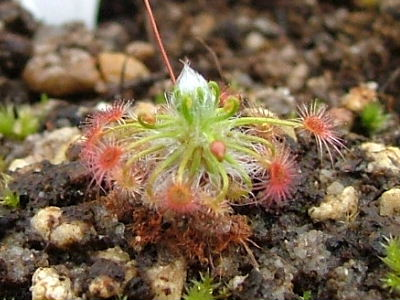
Drosera pedicellaris

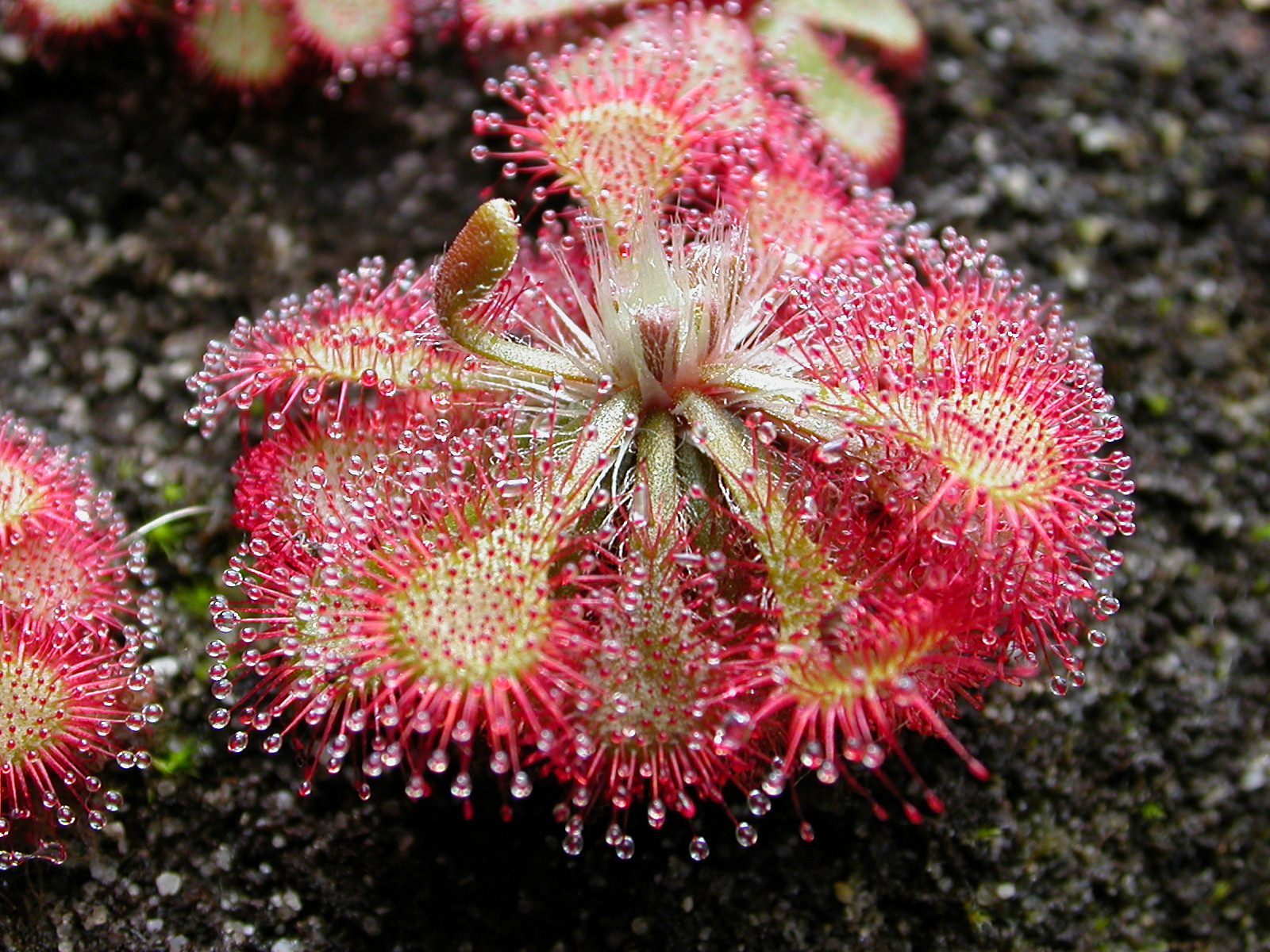
Drosera tokaiensis

=== Drosophyllum ===
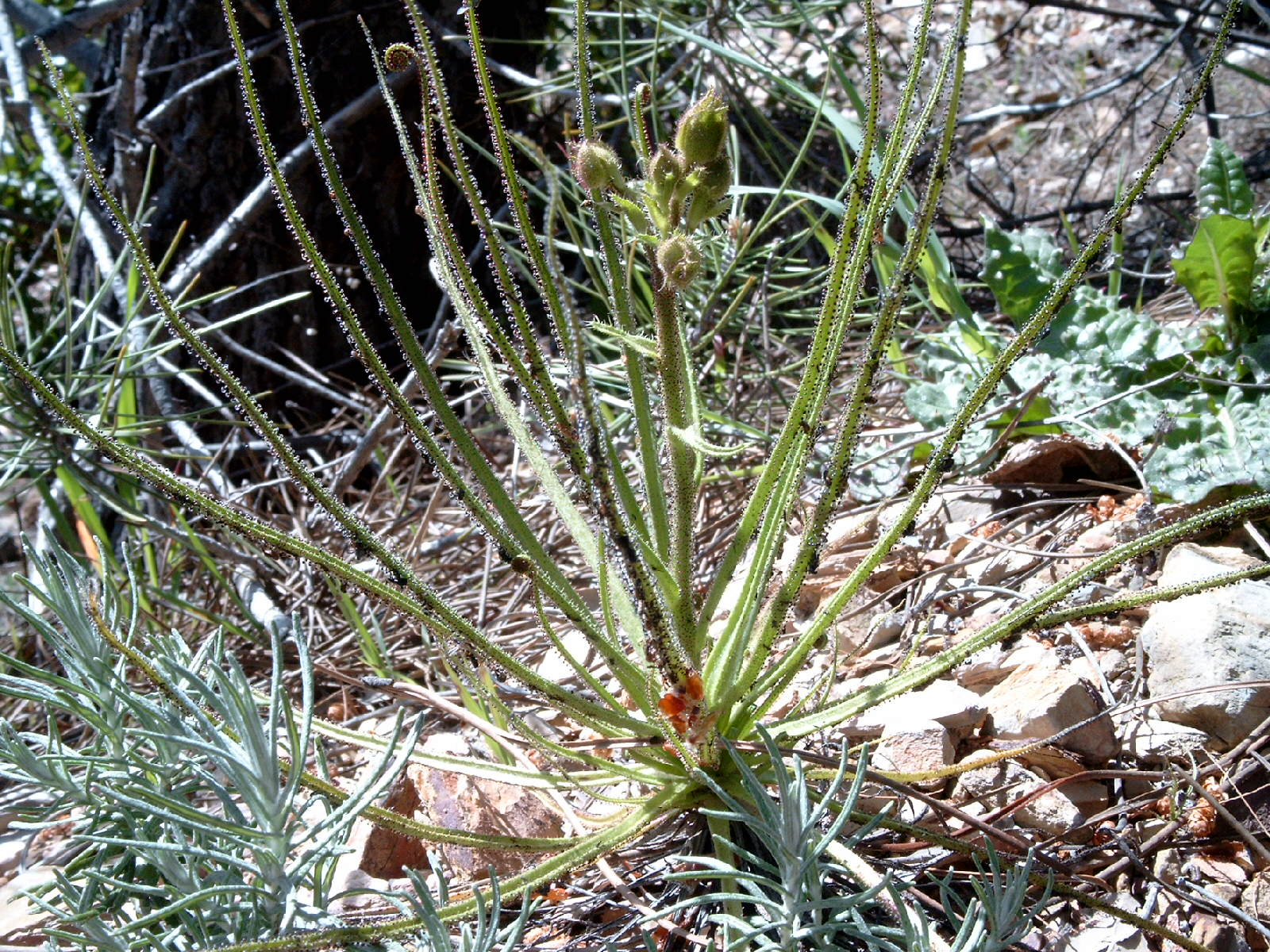
Drosophyllum lusitanicum

This genus contains a single extant species.

- Drosophyllum lusitanicum (L.) Link, 1805 (Bas.: Drosera lusitanica)

=== Genlisea ===
The following list of 29 species is based on Monograph of the Genus Genlisea (2012).

- Genlisea africana Oliv., 1865
- Genlisea angolensis R.D.Good, 1924
- Genlisea aurea A.St.-Hil., 1833
- Genlisea barthlottii S.Porembski, Eb.Fisch. & Gemmel, 1996
- Genlisea exhibitionista Rivadavia & A.Fleischm., 2011
- Genlisea filiformis A.St.-Hil., 1833
- Genlisea flexuosa Rivadavia, A.Fleischm. & Gonella, 2011
- Genlisea glabra P.Taylor, 1967
- Genlisea glandulosissima R.E.Fr., 1916
- Genlisea guianensis N.E.Br., 1900

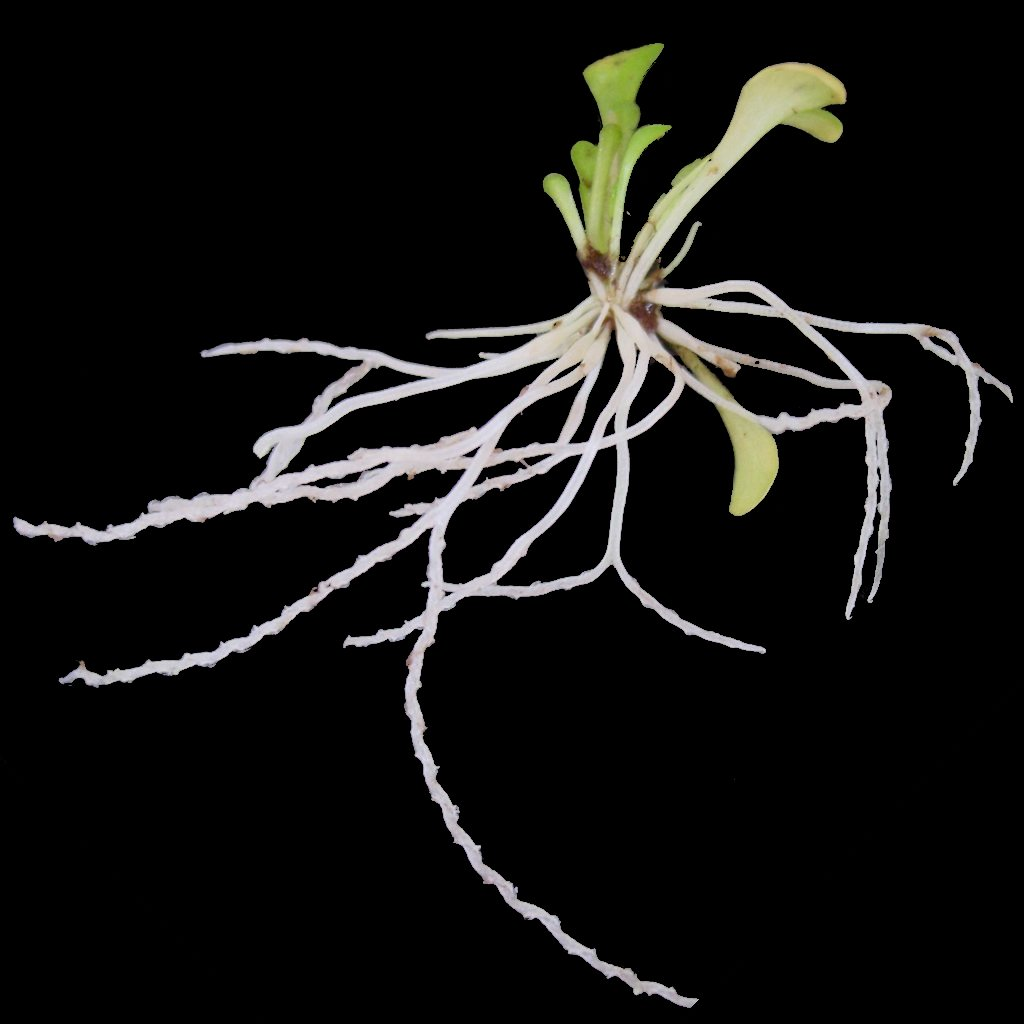
Genlisea violacea

- Genlisea hispidula Stapf, 1904
- Genlisea lobata Fromm, 1989
- Genlisea margaretae Hutch., 1946
- Genlisea metallica Rivadavia & A.Fleischm., 2011
- Genlisea nebulicola Rivadavia, Gonella & A.Fleischm., 2011
- Genlisea nigrocaulis Steyerm., 1948
- Genlisea oligophylla Rivadavia & A.Fleischm., 2011
- Genlisea oxycentron P.Taylor, 1954
- Genlisea pallida Fromm & P.Taylor, 1985
- Genlisea pulchella Tutin, 1934
- Genlisea pygmaea A.St.-Hil., 1833
- Genlisea repens Benj., 1847
- Genlisea roraimensis N.E.Br., 1901
- Genlisea sanariapoana Steyerm., 1953
- Genlisea stapfii A.Chev., 1912
- Genlisea subglabra Stapf, 1906
- Genlisea tuberosa Rivadavia, Gonella & A.Fleischm., 2013
- Genlisea uncinata P.Taylor & Fromm, 1983
- Genlisea violacea A.St.-Hil., 1833

=== Heliamphora ===
The following list of 23 species (plus 2 undescribed species) is based on Sarraceniaceae of South America (2011).

- Heliamphora arenicola Wistuba, A.Fleischm., Nerz & S.McPherson, 2011
- Heliamphora ceracea Nerz, Wistuba, Grantsau, Rivadavia, A.Fleischm. & S.McPherson, 2011
- Heliamphora chimantensis Wistuba, Carow & Harbarth, 2002
- Heliamphora ciliata Wistuba, Nerz & A.Fleischm., 2009
- Heliamphora collina Wistuba, Nerz, S.McPherson & A.Fleischm., 2011
- Heliamphora elongata Nerz, 2004
- Heliamphora exappendiculata (Maguire & Steyermark) Nerz & Wistuba, 2006 (Bas.: Heliamphora heterodoxa var. exappendiculata)
- Heliamphora folliculata Wistuba, Harbarth & Carow, 2001
- Heliamphora glabra Nerz, Wistuba & Hoogenstrijd, 2006
- Heliamphora heterodoxa Steyerm., 1951
- Heliamphora hispida Wistuba & Nerz, 2000
- Heliamphora huberi A.Fleischm., Wistuba & Nerz, 2009
- Heliamphora ionasi Maguire, 1978
- Heliamphora macdonaldae Gleason, 1931
- Heliamphora minor Gleason, 1939
- Heliamphora neblinae Maguire, 1978

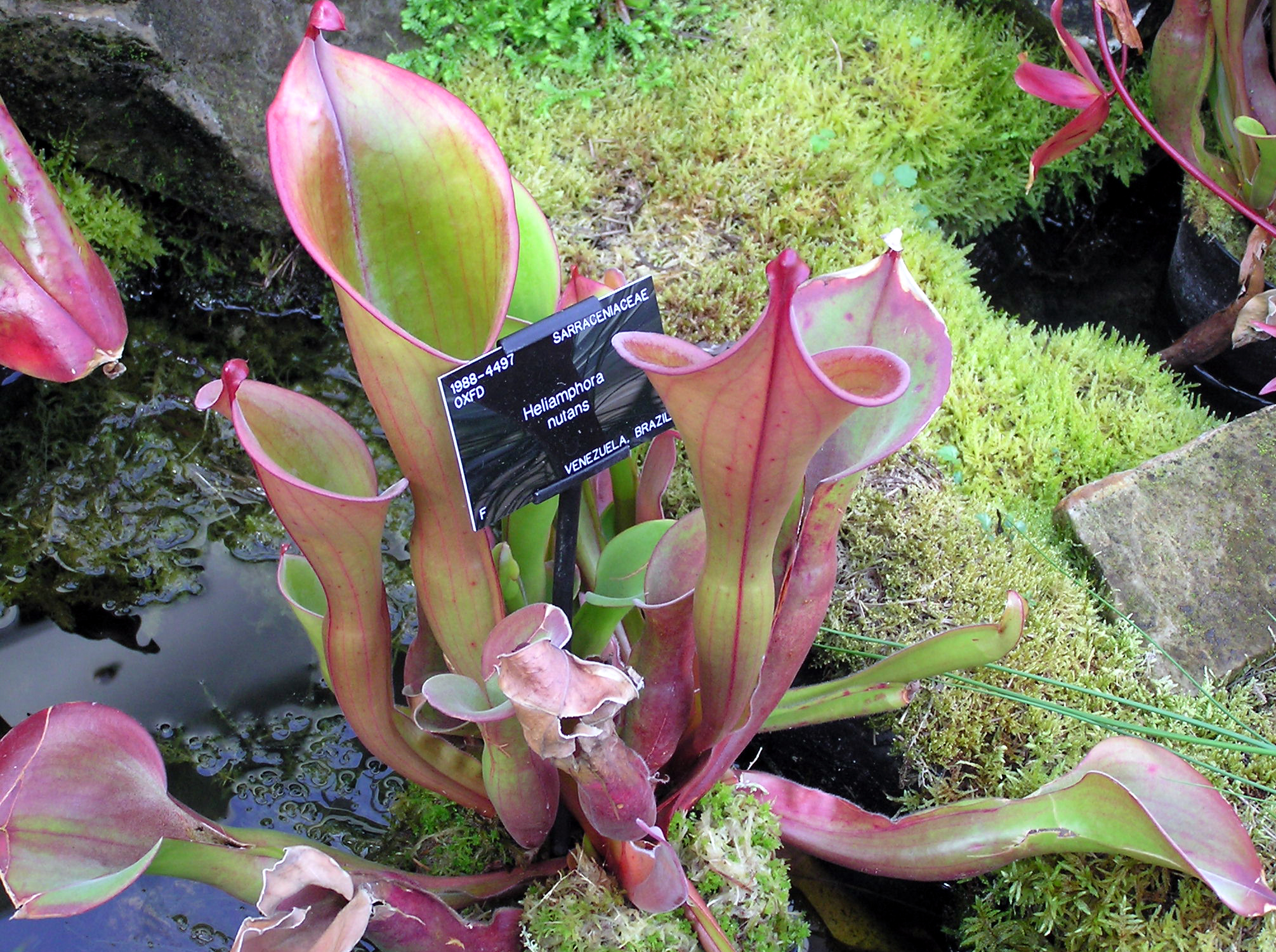
Heliamphora nutans

- Heliamphora nutans Benth., 1840
- Heliamphora parva (Maguire) S.McPherson, A.Fleischm., Wistuba & Nerz, 2011 (Bas.: Heliamphora neblinae var. parva)
- Heliamphora pulchella Wistuba, Carow, Harbarth & Nerz, 2005
- Heliamphora purpurascens Wistuba, A.Fleischm., Nerz & S.McPherson, 2011
- Heliamphora sarracenioides Carow, Wistuba & Harbarth, 2005
- Heliamphora tatei Gleason, 1931
- Heliamphora uncinata Nerz, Wistuba & A.Fleischm., 2009
- Heliamphora sp. 'Akopán Tepui'
- Heliamphora sp. 'Angasima Tepui'

=== Nepenthes ===
The following list of 170 species (plus 2 undescribed species) is based on Pitcher Plants of the Old World (2009) and New Nepenthes (2011), with the addition of newly described species.

- Nepenthes abalata Jebb & Cheek, 2013
- Nepenthes abgracilis Jebb & Cheek, 2013
- Nepenthes adnata Tamin & M.Hotta ex Schlauer, 1994
- Nepenthes aenigma Nuytemans, W.Suarez & Calaramo, 2016
- Nepenthes alata Blanco, 1837
- Nepenthes alba Ridl., 1924
- Nepenthes albomarginata T.Lobb ex Lindl., 1849
- Nepenthes alzapan Jebb & Cheek, 2013
- Nepenthes ampullaria Jack, 1835
- Nepenthes andamana M.Catal., 2010
- Nepenthes angasanensis Maulder, B.R.Salmon, Schub. & Quinn., 1999
- Nepenthes appendiculata Chi C.Lee, Bourke, Rembold, W.Taylor & S.T.Yeo, 2011
- Nepenthes argentii Jebb & Cheek, 1997

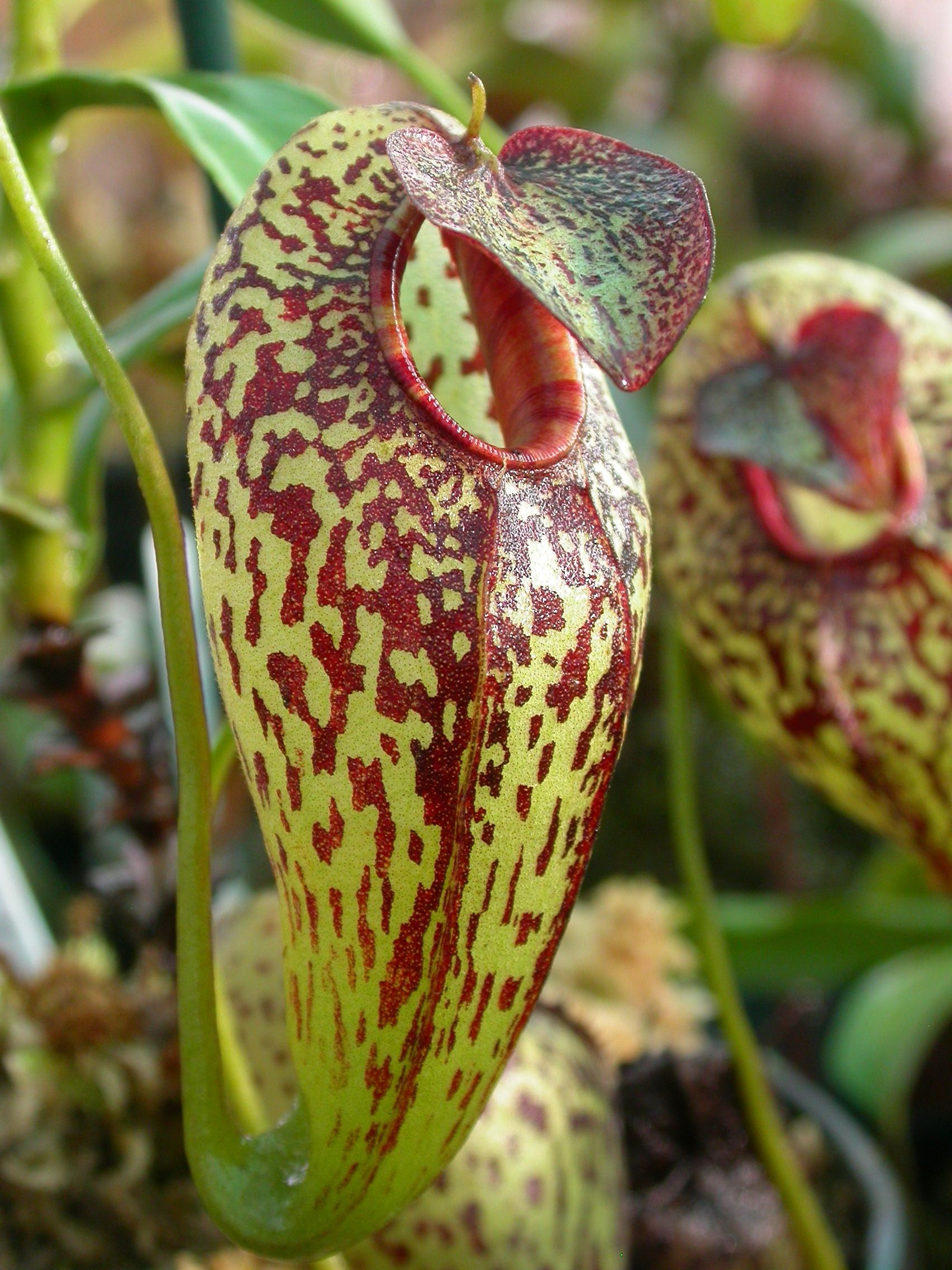
Nepenthes aristolochioides

- Nepenthes aristolochioides Jebb & Cheek, 1997
- Nepenthes armin Jebb & Cheek, 2014
- Nepenthes attenboroughii A.S.Rob., S.McPherson & V.B.Heinrich, 2009
- Nepenthes barcelonae Tandang & Cheek, 2015
- Nepenthes beccariana Macfarl., 1908
- Nepenthes bellii K.Kondo, 1969
- Nepenthes benstonei C.Clarke, 1999
- Nepenthes bicalcarata Hook.f., 1873
- Nepenthes bokorensis Mey, 2009
- Nepenthes bongso Korth., 1839
- Nepenthes boschiana Korth., 1839
- Nepenthes burbidgeae Hook.f. ex Burb., 1882
- Nepenthes burkei Hort.Veitch ex Mast., 1889
- Nepenthes campanulata Sh.Kurata, 1973
- Nepenthes ceciliae Gronem., Coritico, Micheler, Marwinski, Acil & V.B.Amoroso, 2011
- Nepenthes chang M.Catal., 2010
- Nepenthes chaniana C.Clarke, Chi C.Lee & S.McPherson, 2006
- Nepenthes cid Jebb & Cheek, 2013
- Nepenthes clipeata Danser, 1928
- Nepenthes copelandii Merr. ex Macfarl., 1908
- Nepenthes cornuta Marwinski, Coritico, Wistuba, Micheler, Gronem., Gieray & V.B.Amoroso, 2014
- Nepenthes danseri Jebb & Cheek, 1997
- Nepenthes deaniana Macfarl., 1908
- Nepenthes densiflora Danser, 1940
- Nepenthes diabolica A.Bianchi, Chi.C.Lee, Golos, Mey, M.Mansur & A.S.Rob.
- Nepenthes diatas Jebb & Cheek, 1997
- Nepenthes distillatoria L., 1753
- Nepenthes dubia Danser, 1928
- Nepenthes edwardsiana H.Low ex Hook.f., 1859
- Nepenthes ephippiata Danser, 1928
- Nepenthes epiphytica A.S.Rob., Nerz & Wistuba, 2011
- Nepenthes eustachya Miq., 1858
- Nepenthes extincta Jebb & Cheek, 2013

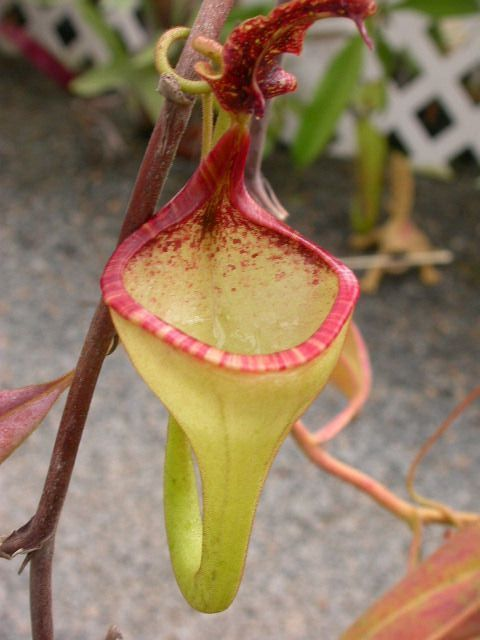
Nepenthes eymae

- Nepenthes eymae Sh.Kurata, 1984
- Nepenthes faizaliana J.H.Adam & Wilcock, 1991
- Nepenthes flava Wistuba, Nerz & A.Fleischm., 2007
- Nepenthes fusca Danser, 1928
- Nepenthes gantungensis S.McPherson, Cervancia, Chi C.Lee, Jaunzems, Mey & A.S.Rob., 2010
- Nepenthes glabrata J.R.Turnbull & A.T.Middleton, 1984
- Nepenthes glandulifera Chi C.Lee, 2004
- Nepenthes graciliflora Elmer, 1912
- Nepenthes gracilis Korth., 1839
- Nepenthes gracillima Ridl., 1908
- Nepenthes gymnamphora Reinw. ex Nees, 1824
- Nepenthes halmahera Cheek, 2015
- Nepenthes hamata J.R.Turnbull & A.T.Middleton, 1984
- Nepenthes hamiguitanensis Gronem., Wistuba, V.B.Heinrich, S.McPherson, Mey & V.B.Amoroso, 2010
- Nepenthes hemsleyana Macfarl., 1908
- Nepenthes hirsuta Hook.f., 1873
- Nepenthes hispida Beck, 1895
- Nepenthes holdenii Mey, 2010
- Nepenthes hurrelliana Cheek & A.L.Lamb, 2003
- Nepenthes inermis Danser, 1928
- Nepenthes insignis Danser, 1928
- Nepenthes izumiae Troy Davis, C.Clarke, & Tamin, 2003
- Nepenthes jacquelineae C.Clarke, Troy Davis & Tamin, 2001
- Nepenthes jamban Chi C.Lee, 2006
- Nepenthes junghuhnii Macfarl. in sched., 1917
- Nepenthes justinae Gronem., Wistuba, Mey & V.B.Amoroso, 2016
- Nepenthes kampotiana Lecomte, 1909
- Nepenthes kerrii M.Catal. & Kruetr., 2010
- Nepenthes khasiana Hook.f., 1873
- Nepenthes kitanglad Jebb & Cheek, 2013
- Nepenthes klossii Ridl., 1916
- Nepenthes kongkandana M.Catal. & Kruetr., 2015
- Nepenthes krabiensis Nuanlaong, Onsanit, Chusangrach & Suraninpong, 2016
- Nepenthes lamii Jebb & Cheek, 1997
- Nepenthes lavicola Wistuba & Rischer, 1996
- Nepenthes leonardoi S.McPherson, Bourke, Cervancia, Jaunzems & A.S.Rob., 2011
- Nepenthes leyte Jebb & Cheek, 2013
- Nepenthes lingulata Chi C.Lee, 2006
- Nepenthes longifolia Nerz & Wistuba, 1994
- Nepenthes lowii Hook.f., 1859
- Nepenthes macfarlanei Hemsl., 1905
- Nepenthes macrophylla (Marabini) Jebb & Cheek, 1997 (Bas.: Nepenthes edwardsiana subsp.macrophylla)
- Nepenthes macrovulgaris J.R.Turnbull & A.T.Middleton, 1987
- Nepenthes madagascariensis Poir., 1797
- Nepenthes mantalingajanensis Nerz & Wistuba, 2007
- Nepenthes mapuluensis J.H.Adam & Wilcock, 1990
- Nepenthes maryae Jebb & Cheek, 2016
- Nepenthes masoalensis Schmid-Hollinger, 1977
- Nepenthes maxima Reinw. ex Nees, 1824
- Nepenthes merrilliana Macfarl., 1911
- Nepenthes micramphora V.B.Heinrich, S.McPherson, Gronem. & V.B.Amoroso, 2009
- Nepenthes mikei B.R.Salmon & Maulder, 1995
- Nepenthes mindanaoensis Sh.Kurata, 2001
- Nepenthes minima Jebb & Cheek, 2016
- Nepenthes mira Jebb & Cheek, 1998
- Nepenthes mirabilis (Lour.) Rafarin, 1869 (Bas.: Phyllamphora mirabilis)
- Nepenthes mollis Danser, 1928
- Nepenthes monticola A.S.Rob., Wistuba, Nerz, M.Mansur & S.McPherson, 2011
- Nepenthes muluensis M.Hotta, 1996
- Nepenthes murudensis Culham, 1994
- Nepenthes naga Akhriadi, Hernawati, Primaldhi & M.Hambali, 2009
- Nepenthes nebularum G.Mansell & W.Suarez, 2016
- Nepenthes negros Jebb & Cheek, 2013
- Nepenthes neoguineensis Macfarl., 1911
- Nepenthes nigra Nerz, Wistuba, Chi C.Lee, Bourke, U.Zimm. & S.McPherson, 2011
- Nepenthes northiana Hook.f., 1881
- Nepenthes ovata Nerz & Wistuba, 1994
- Nepenthes palawanensis S.McPherson, Cervancia, Chi C.Lee, Jaunzems, Mey & A.S.Rob., 2010
- Nepenthes paniculata Danser, 1928
- Nepenthes pantaronensis Gieray, Gronem., Wistuba, Marwinski, Micheler, Coritico & V.B.Amoroso, 2014
- Nepenthes papuana Danser, 1928
- Nepenthes parvula Gary W.Wilson & S.Venter, 2016
- Nepenthes peltata Sh.Kurata, 2008
- Nepenthes pervillei Blume, 1852
- Nepenthes petiolata Danser, 1928
- Nepenthes philippinensis Macfarl., 1908
- Nepenthes pilosa Danser, 1928
- Nepenthes pitopangii Chi C.Lee, S.McPherson, Bourke & M.Mansur, 2009
- Nepenthes platychila Chi C.Lee, 2002
- Nepenthes pulchra Gronem., S.McPherson, Coritico, Micheler, Marwinski & V.B.Amoroso, 2011
- Nepenthes rafflesiana Jack, 1835

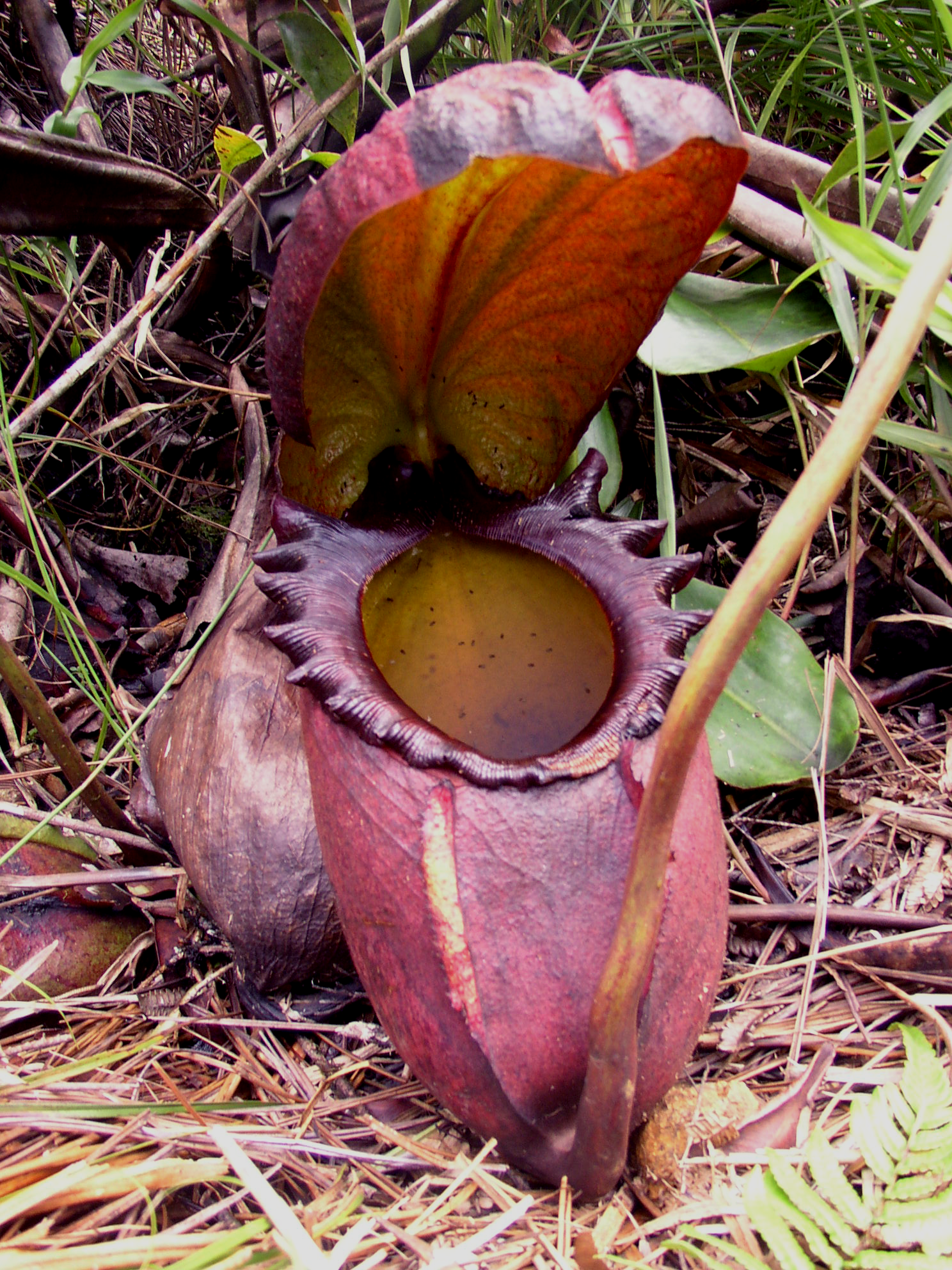
Nepenthes rajah

- Nepenthes rajah Hook.f., 1859
- Nepenthes ramispina Ridl., 1909
- Nepenthes ramos Jebb & Cheek, 2013
- Nepenthes reinwardtiana Miq., 1851
- Nepenthes rhombicaulis Sh.Kurata, 1973
- Nepenthes rigidifolia Akhriadi, Hernawati & Tamin, 2004
- Nepenthes robcantleyi Cheek, 2011
- Nepenthes rosea M.Catal. & Kruetr., 2014
- Nepenthes rowaniae Bail., 1897
- Nepenthes samar Jebb & Cheek, 2013
- Nepenthes sanguinea Lindl., 1849
- Nepenthes saranganiensis Sh.Kurata, 2003
- Nepenthes sibuyanensis Nerz, 1998
- Nepenthes singalana Becc., 1886
- Nepenthes smilesii Hemsl., 1895
- Nepenthes spathulata Danser, 1935
- Nepenthes spectabilis Danser, 1928
- Nepenthes stenophylla Mast., 1890
- Nepenthes sumagaya Cheek, 2014
- Nepenthes sumatrana (Miq.) Beck, 1895 (Bas.: Nepenthes boschiana var.sumatrana)
- Nepenthes suratensis M.Catal., 2010
- Nepenthes surigaoensis Elmer, 1915
- Nepenthes talaandig Gronem., Coritico, Wistuba, Micheler, Marwinski, Gieray & V.B.Amoroso, 2014
- Nepenthes talangensis Nerz & Wistuba, 1994
- Nepenthes tboli Jebb & Cheek, 2014
- Nepenthes tenax C.Clarke & R.Kruger, 2006
- Nepenthes tentaculata Hook.f., 1873
- Nepenthes tenuis Nerz & Wistuba, 1994
- Nepenthes thai Cheek, 2009
- Nepenthes thorelii Lecomte, 1909
- Nepenthes tobaica Danser, 1928
- Nepenthes tomoriana Danser, 1928
- Nepenthes treubiana Warb., 1851
- Nepenthes truncata Macfarl., 1911
- Nepenthes ultra Jebb & Cheek, 2013
- Nepenthes undulatifolia Nerz, Wistuba, U.Zimm., Chi C.Lee, Pirade & Pitopang, 2011
- Nepenthes veitchii Hook.f., 1859
- Nepenthes ventricosa Blanco, 1837
- Nepenthes vieillardii Hook.f., 1873

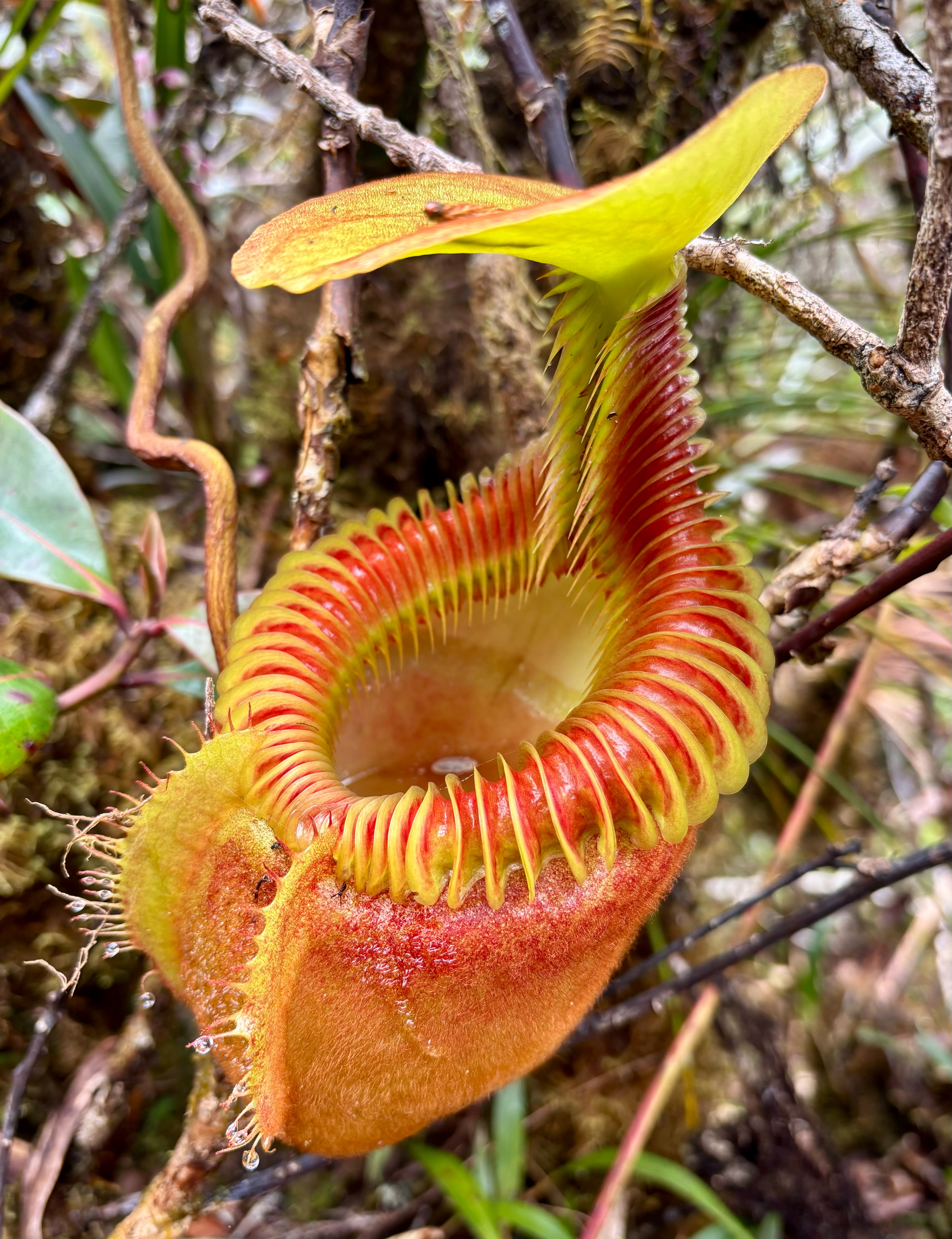
Nepenthes villosa

- Nepenthes villosa Hook.f., 1852
- Nepenthes viridis Micheler, Gronem., Wistuba, Marwinski, W.Suarez & V.B.Amoroso, 2013
- Nepenthes vogelii Schuit. & de Vogel, 2002
- Nepenthes weda Cheek, 2015
- Nepenthes zygon Jebb & Cheek, 2014
- Nepenthes sp. Anipahan
- Nepenthes sp. Misool

=== Philcoxia ===
This genus contains seven extant species, all of which are thought to be carnivorous.

- Philcoxia bahiensis V.C.Souza & Harley, 2000
- Philcoxia goiasensis P.Taylor, 2000
- Philcoxia minensis V.C.Souza & Giul., 2000
- Philcoxia tuberosa M.L.S.Carvalho & L.P.Queiroz, 2014
- Philcoxia rhizomatosa A.V.Scatigna & V.C.Souza, 2015
- Philcoxia maranhensis A.V.Scatigna, 2017
- Philcoxia courensis A.V.Scatigna, 2017

=== Pinguicula ===
- Pinguicula acuminata Benth., 1839
- Pinguicula agnata Casper, 1963
- Pinguicula albida Wright ex Griseb., 1866
- Pinguicula algida Malyschev, 1966
- Pinguicula alpina L., 1753
- Pinguicula antarctica Vahl, 1827
- Pinguicula balcanica Casper, 1962
- Pinguicula benedicta Barnhart, 1920
- Pinguicula bissei Casper, 2004
- Pinguicula caerulea Walt., 1788
- Pinguicula calderoniae Zamudio Ruiz, 2001
- Pinguicula calyptrata H.B.K., 1817
- Pinguicula caryophyllacea Casper, 2004
- Pinguicula casabitoana Jimenez, 1960
- Pinguicula chilensis Clos, 1849
- Pinguicula chuquisacensis S.Beck, A.Fleischm. & Borsch, 2008
- Pinguicula clivorum Standl. & Steyerm., 1944
- Pinguicula colimensis McVaugh & Mickel, 1963
- Pinguicula conzattii Zamudio Ruiz & van Marm, 2003
- Pinguicula corsica Bern. & Gren. ex Gren. & Godr, 1850
- Pinguicula crassifolia Zamudio Ruiz, 1988
- Pinguicula crenatiloba A.DC., 1844
- Pinguicula crystallina Sibth. ex Sibth. & Smith, 1806
- Pinguicula cubensis Urquiola & Casper, 2003
- Pinguicula cyclosecta Casper, 1963
- Pinguicula debbertiana Speta & Fuchs, 1992
- Pinguicula ehlersiae Speta & Fuchs, 1982
- Pinguicula elizabethiae Zamudio Ruiz, 1999
- Pinguicula elongata Benj., 1847
- Pinguicula emarginata Zamudio Ruiz & Rzedowski, 1986
- Pinguicula esseriana B.Kirchner, 1981
- Pinguicula filifolia Wright ex Griseb., 1866
- Pinguicula gigantea Luhrs, 1995
- Pinguicula gracilis Zamudio Ruiz, 1988
- Pinguicula grandiflora Lam., 1789
- Pinguicula greenwoodii Cheek, 1994
- Pinguicula gypsicola Brandeg., 1911
- Pinguicula habilii Yıldırım, Şenol & Pirhan, 2012
- Pinguicula hemiepiphytica Zamudio Ruiz & Rzedowski, 1991
- Pinguicula heterophylla Benth., 1839
- Pinguicula ibarrae Zamudio Ruiz, 2005
- Pinguicula imitatrix Casper, 1963
- Pinguicula immaculata Zamudio Ruiz & Lux, 1992
- Pinguicula infundibuliformis Casper, 2003
- Pinguicula involuta Ruiz & Pav., 1789
- Pinguicula ionantha Godfr., 1961
- Pinguicula jackii Barnhart, 1930
- Pinguicula jaumavensis Debbert, 1991
- Pinguicula kondoi Casper, 1974
- Pinguicula laueana Speta & Fuchs, 1989
- Pinguicula laxifolia Luhrs, 1995
- Pinguicula leptoceras Rchb., 1823
- Pinguicula lignicola Barnhart, 1920
- Pinguicula lilacina Schlecht. & Cham., 1830
- Pinguicula lippoldii Casper, 2007
- Pinguicula lithophytica C.Panfet-Valdés & P.Temple, 2008
- Pinguicula longifolia Ram. ex DC., 1805
- Pinguicula lusitanica L., 1753
- Pinguicula lutea Walt., 1788
- Pinguicula macroceras Link, 1820
- Pinguicula macrophylla H.B.K., 1817
- Pinguicula martinezii Zamudio Ruiz, 2005
- Pinguicula mesophytica Zamudio Ruiz, 1997
- Pinguicula mirandae Zamudio Ruiz & Salinas, 1996
- Pinguicula moctezumae Zamudio Ruiz & R.Z.Ortega, 1994

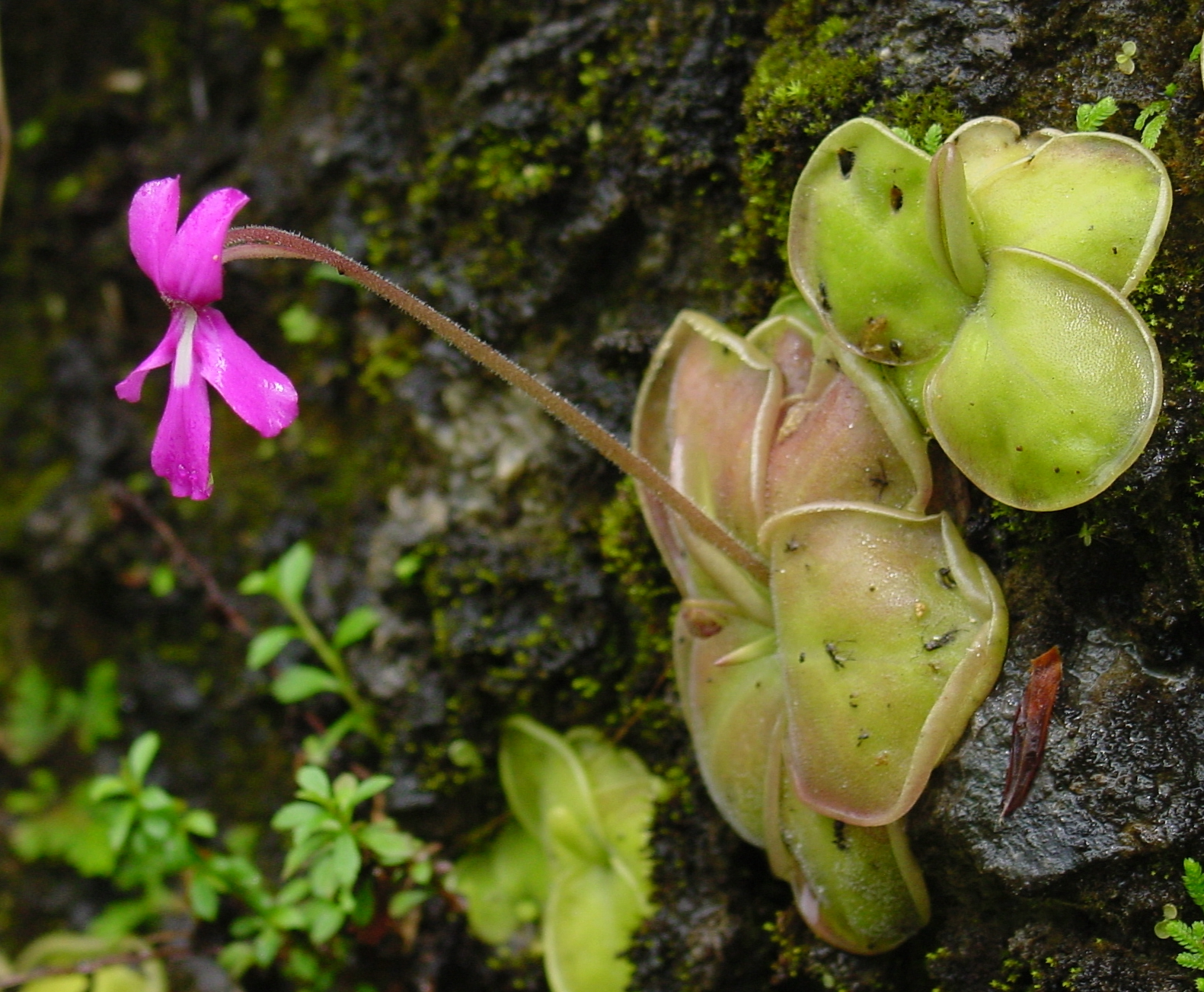
Pinguicula moranensis

- Pinguicula moranensis H.B.K., 1817
- Pinguicula mundi Blanca, Jamilena, Ruiz-Rejon & Zamora, 1996
- Pinguicula nevadensis (Lindbg.) Casper, 1962 (Bas.: Pinguicula vulgaris subsp. nevadensis)
- Pinguicula oblongiloba A.DC., 1844
- Pinguicula orchidioides A.DC., 1844
- Pinguicula parvifolia Robinson, 1894
- Pinguicula pilosa Luhrs, Studnicka & Gluch, 2004
- Pinguicula planifolia Chapm., 1897
- Pinguicula poldinii Steiger & Casper, 2001
- Pinguicula potosiensis Speta & Fuchs, 1989
- Pinguicula primuliflora Wood & Godfr., 1957
- Pinguicula pumila Michx., 1803
- Pinguicula ramosa Miyoshi ex Yatabe, 1890
- Pinguicula rectifolia Speta & Fuchs, 1989
- Pinguicula reticulata Fuchs ex Schlauer, 1991
- Pinguicula rotundiflora Studnicka, 1985
- Pinguicula sharpii Casper & K.Kondo, 1997
- Pinguicula takakii Zamudio Ruiz & Rzedowski, 1986
- Pinguicula toldensis Casper, 2007
- Pinguicula utricularioides Zamudio Ruiz & Rzedowski, 1991
- Pinguicula vallisneriifolia Webb, 1853
- Pinguicula variegata Turcz., 1840
- Pinguicula villosa L., 1753
- Pinguicula vulgaris L., 1753
- Pinguicula zecheri Speta & Fuchs, 1982

=== Roridula ===
This genus contains two extant species.

- Roridula dentata L., 1764
- Roridula gorgonias Planch., 1848

=== Sarracenia ===
The following list of 8 species is based on Sarraceniaceae of North America (2011).

- Sarracenia alata (Alph.Wood) Alph.Wood, 1863 (Bas.: Sarracenia gronovii var. alata)
- Sarracenia flava L., 1753
- Sarracenia leucophylla Raf., 1817
- Sarracenia minor Walt., 1788

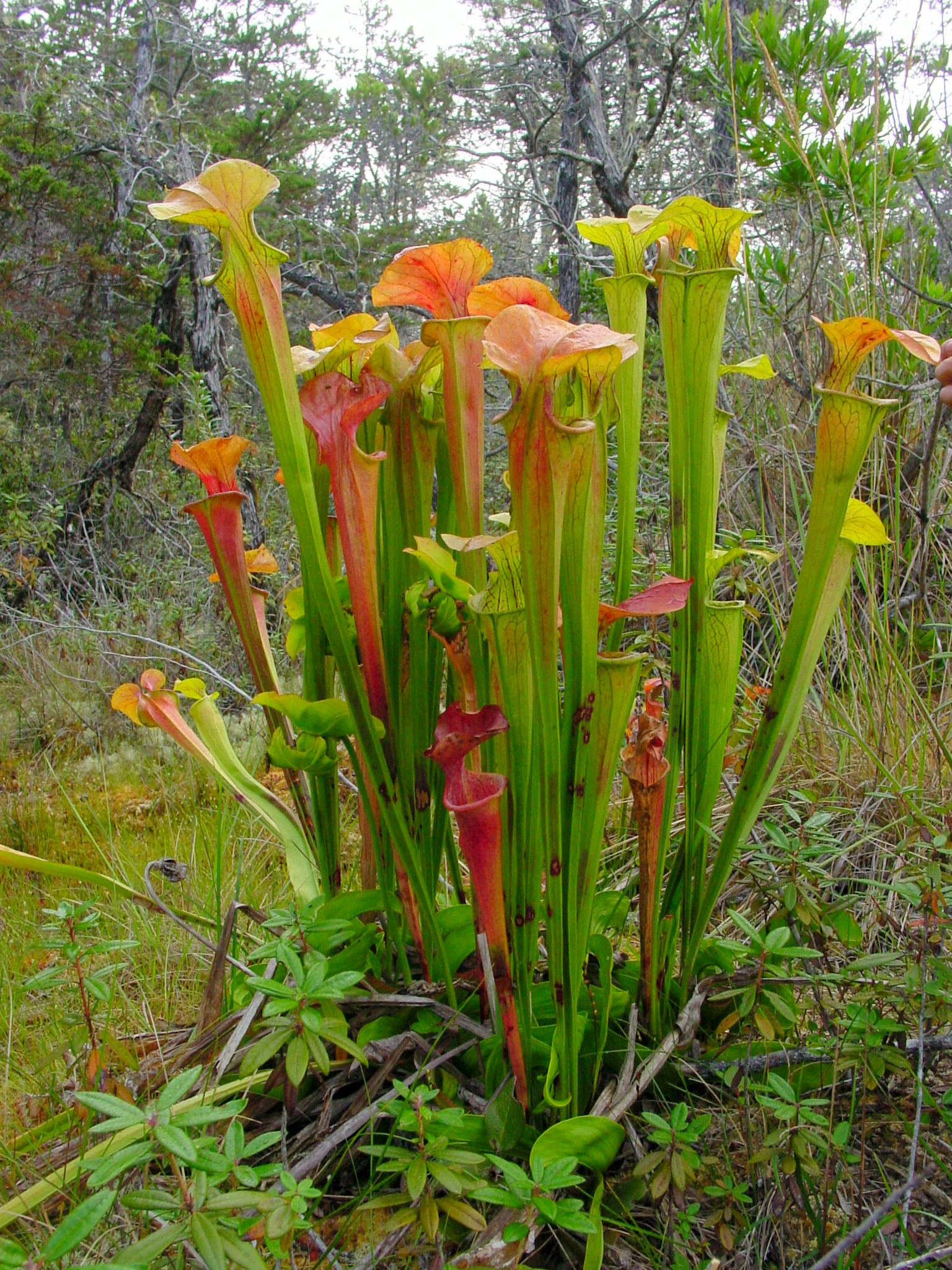
Sarracenia oreophila

- Sarracenia oreophila (Kearney) Wherry, 1933 (Bas.: Sarracenia flava var. oreophila)
- Sarracenia psittacina Michx., 1803
- Sarracenia purpurea L., 1753
- Sarracenia rubra Walt., 1788

Some authorities additionally recognise up to three more species:

- Sarracenia alabamensis Case & R.B.Case, 2005
- Sarracenia jonesii Wherry, 1929
- Sarracenia rosea Naczi, Case & R.B.Case, 1999

=== Saxifraga ===
- Saxifraga candelabrum Franch., 1890

=== Stylidium ===
Around 300 species of Stylidium are currently recognised.

- Stylidium accedens
- Stylidium aceratum
- Stylidium aciculare
- Stylidium acuminatum
- Stylidium adenophorum
- Stylidium adnatum : Beaked triggerplant
- Stylidium adpressum : Trigger-on-stilts
- Stylidium aeonioides
- Stylidium affine : Queen triggerplant
- Stylidium albolilacinum
- Stylidium albomontis
- Stylidium alsinoides
- Stylidium amoenum : Lovely (or Beautiful) triggerplant
- Stylidium androsaceum
- Stylidium aquaticum
- Stylidium arenicola
- Stylidium armerium
- Stylidium articulatum : Stout triggerplant
- Stylidium assimile : Bronze-leaved triggerplant
- Stylidium asymmetricum : Asymmetric triggerplant
- Stylidium austrocapense
- Stylidium barleei : Tooth-leaved triggerplant
- Stylidium bauthas
- Stylidium beaugleholei
- Stylidium begoniifolium
- Stylidium bellidifolium
- Stylidium bicolor
- Stylidium breviscapum : Boomerang triggerplant
- Stylidium brunonianum : Pink fountain triggerplant
- Stylidium brunonis
- Stylidium bryoides

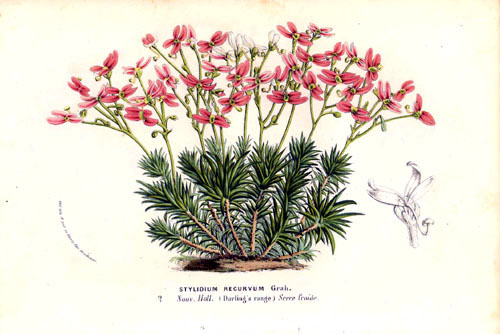
Stylidium bulbiferum

- Stylidium bulbiferum : Circus triggerplant
- Stylidium burbidgeanum
- Stylidium buxifolium
- Stylidium caespitosum : Fly-away triggerplant
- Stylidium calcaratum : Book triggerplant
- Stylidium candelabrum
- Stylidium capillare
- Stylidium caricifolium : Milkmaids
- Stylidium carlquistii
- Stylidium carnosum : Fleshy-leaved triggerplant
- Stylidium caulescens
- Stylidium ceratophorum
- Stylidium chiddarcoopingense
- Stylidium chinense
- Stylidium choreanthum : Dancing triggerplant
- Stylidium cicatricosum
- Stylidium ciliatum : Golden triggerplant
- Stylidium cilium
- Stylidium clarksonii
- Stylidium clavatum
- Stylidium claytonioides
- Stylidium coatesianum
- Stylidium compressum
- Stylidium confertum
- Stylidium confluens
- Stylidium cordifolium
- Stylidium coroniforme : Wongan Hills triggerplant
- Stylidium corymbosum : Whitecaps
- Stylidium costulatum
- Stylidium crassifolium : Thick-leaved triggerplant
- Stylidium crossocephalum : Posy triggerplant
- Stylidium cuneiformis
- Stylidium cygnorum
- Stylidium cymiferum
- Stylidium daphne
- Stylidium debile
- Stylidium delicatum
- Stylidium desertorum
- Stylidium despectum : Dwarf triggerplant
- Stylidium diceratum

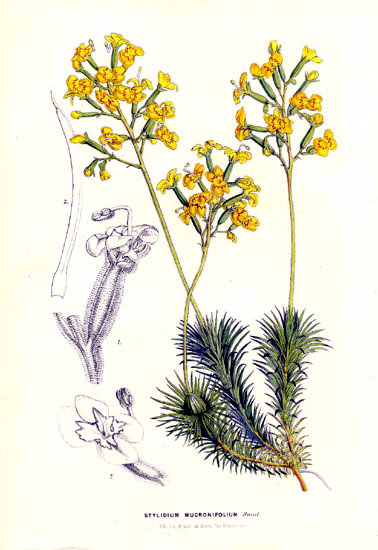
Stylidium dichotomum

- Stylidium dichotomum : Pins-and-needles
- Stylidium dicksonii
- Stylidium dielsianum : Tangle triggerplant
- Stylidium diffusum
- Stylidium dilatatum
- Stylidium diplectroglossum
- Stylidium dispermum
- Stylidium diuroides : Donkey triggerplant
- Stylidium divaricatum : Daddy-long-legs
- Stylidium divergens
- Stylidium diversifolium : Touch-me-not
- Stylidium drummondianum
- Stylidium dunlopianum
- Stylidium ecorne : Foot triggerplant
- Stylidium edentatum
- Stylidium eglandulosum : Wooly-stemmed triggerplant
- Stylidium elegans
- Stylidium elongatum : Tall triggerplant
- Stylidium emarginatum
- Stylidium ensatum
- Stylidium ericksonae
- Stylidium eriopodum
- Stylidium eriorhizum
- Stylidium evolutum
- Stylidium expeditionis : Tutanning triggerplant
- Stylidium falcatum : Slender beaked triggerplant

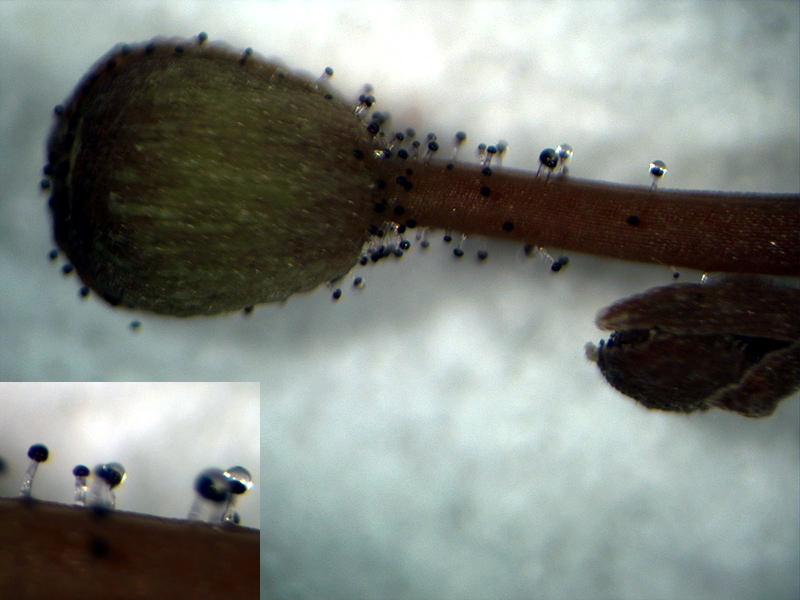
Bud and scape of Stylidium fimbriatum displaying the trichomes that can trap and kill insects.

- Stylidium fimbriatum
- Stylidium fissilobum
- Stylidium flagellum
- Stylidium floodii
- Stylidium floribundum
- Stylidium flumense
- Stylidium fluminense
- Stylidium foveolatum
- Stylidium fruticosum
- Stylidium galioides : Yellow mountain triggerplant
- Stylidium glabrifolium
- Stylidium glandulosum : Bushy triggerplant
- Stylidium glandulosissimum
- Stylidium glaucum : Grey triggerplant
- Stylidium graminifolium : Grass triggerplant
- Stylidium guttatum : Dotted triggerplant
- Stylidium gypsophiloides
- Stylidium hebegynum
- Stylidium hirsutum : Hairy triggerplant
- Stylidium hispidum : White butterfly triggerplant
- Stylidium hortiorum
- Stylidium hugelii
- Stylidium humphreysii
- Stylidium imbricatum : Tile-leaved triggerplant
- Stylidium inaequipetalum
- Stylidium inconspicuum
- Stylidium induratum : Desert triggerplant
- Stylidium insensitivum : Isensitive triggerplant
- Stylidium inundatum : Hundreds and Thousands
- Stylidium inversiflorum
- Stylidium involucratum
- Stylidium ireneae
- Stylidium javanicum
- Stylidium junceum : Reed triggerplant
- Stylidium kalbarriense
- Stylidium keigheryi
- Stylidium kunthii
- Stylidium lachnopodum
- Stylidium laciniatum : Tattered triggerplant

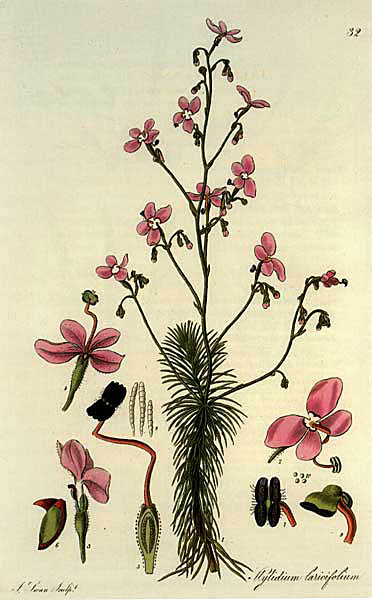
Stlydium laricifolium print from William Jackson Hooker's 1823 Exotic Flora.

- Stylidium laricifolium : Tree (or Larch-leaf) triggerplant
- Stylidium lateriticola
- Stylidium lehmannianum
- Stylidium leiophyllum
- Stylidium lepidum : Redcaps
- Stylidium leptobotrydium
- Stylidium leptobotrys
- Stylidium leptocalyx : Slender-calyxed triggerplant
- Stylidium leptophyllum : Needle-leaved triggerplant
- Stylidium leptorrhizum
- Stylidium leptostachyum
- Stylidium lessonii
- Stylidium leeuwinense
- Stylidium limbatum : Fringed-leaved triggerplant
- Stylidium lindleyanum
- Stylidium lineare : Narrow-leaved triggerplant
- Stylidium lineatum : Sunny triggerplant
- Stylidium lobuliflorum
- Stylidium longibracteatum : Long-bracted triggerplant
- Stylidium longicornu
- Stylidium longifolium
- Stylidium longissimum
- Stylidium longitubum : Jumping Jacks
- Stylidium lowrieanum
- Stylidium luteum : Yellow triggerplant
- Stylidium macranthum : Crab claws
- Stylidium maitlandianum : Fountain triggerplant
- Stylidium majus
- Stylidium marginatum
- Stylidium maritimum
- Stylidium marradongense
- Stylidium megacarpum
- Stylidium melastachys
- Stylidium merrallii : Merralls triggerplant
- Stylidium mimeticum
- Stylidium miniatum : Pink butterfly triggerplant
- Stylidium minus
- Stylidium mitchellii
- Stylidium mitrasacmoides
- Stylidium montanum
- Stylidium mucronatum
- Stylidium multiscapum
- Stylidium muscicola
- Stylidium neglectum : Neglected triggerplant
- Stylidium nominatum
- Stylidium nonscandens
- Stylidium nudum
- Stylidium nunagarensis : Nungarin triggerplant
- Stylidium obtusatum : Pinafore triggerplant
- Stylidium ornatum
- Stylidium oviflorum
- Stylidium pachyrrhizum
- Stylidium paniculatum
- Stylidium paulineae
- Stylidium pedunculatum
- Stylidium pendulum
- Stylidium periscelianthum : Pantaloon triggerplant
- Stylidium perizostera
- Stylidium perminutum
- Stylidium perpusillum : Tiny triggerplant
- Stylidium petiolare : Horned triggerplant
- Stylidium piliferum : Common butterfly triggerplant
- Stylidium pingrupense
- Stylidium planifolium
- Stylidium plantagineum : Plantagenet triggerplant
- Stylidium polystachium
- Stylidium preissii : Lizard triggerplant
- Stylidium pritzelianum : Royal triggerplant

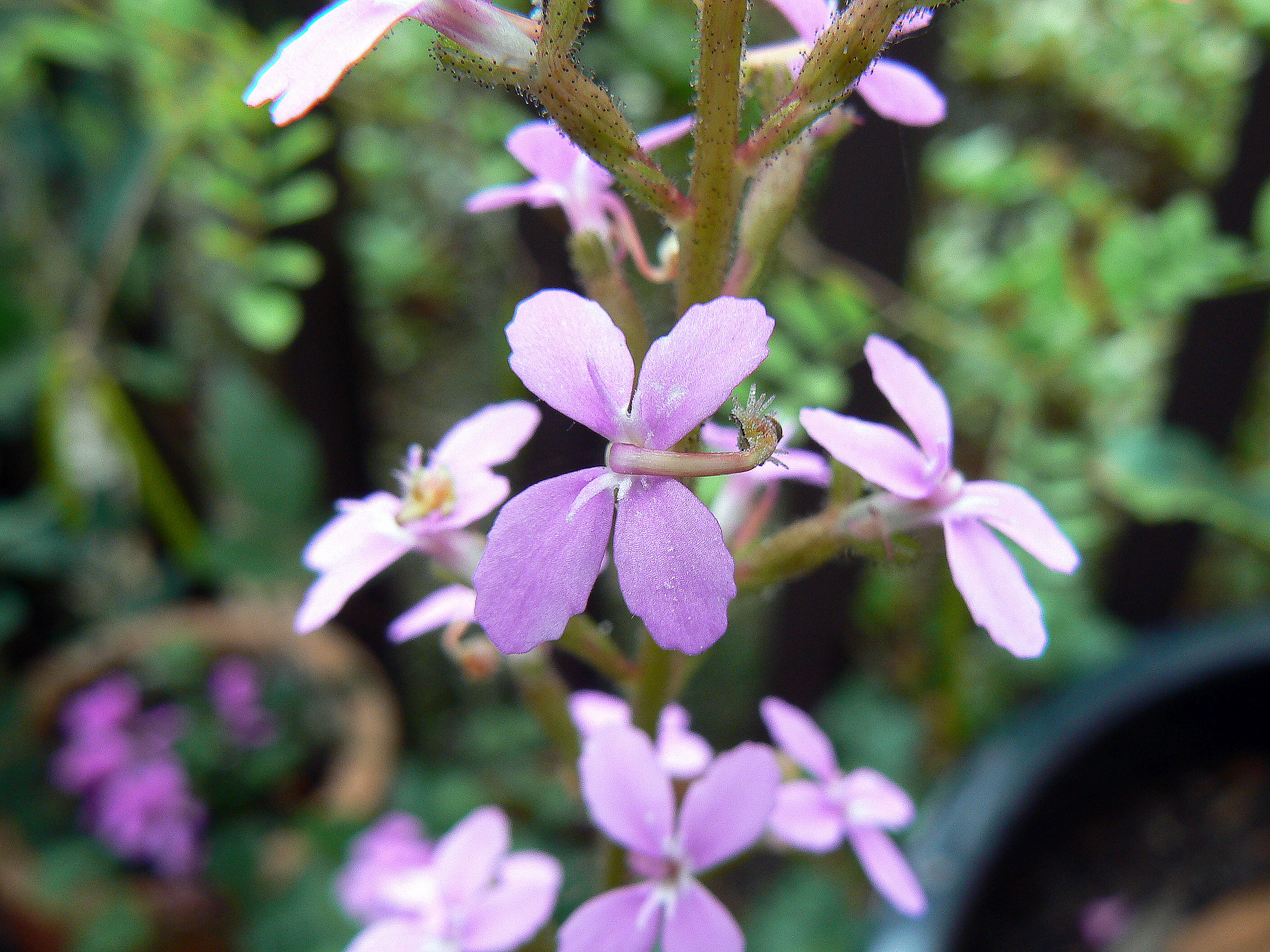
Stylidium productum

- Stylidium productum
- Stylidium proliferum
- Stylidium prophyllum
- Stylidium propinquum
- Stylidium pruinosum
- Stylidium pseudocaespitosum
- Stylidium pseudohirsutum
- Stylidium pseudosacculatum
- Stylidium pseudotenellum
- Stylidium pubigerum : Yellow Butterfly triggerplant
- Stylidium pulchellum : Thumbelina triggerplant
- Stylidium pulviniforme
- Stylidium pycnostachyum : Downy triggerplant
- Stylidium pygmaeum : Pygmy triggerplant
- Stylidium quadrifurcatum : Four-pronged triggerplant
- Stylidium ramosissimum
- Stylidium ramosum
- Stylidium reductum
- Stylidium reduplicatum
- Stylidium repens : Matted triggerplant
- Stylidium rhipidium : Fan triggerplant
- Stylidium rhynchocarpum : Black-beaked triggerplant
- Stylidium ricae
- Stylidium rigidulum
- Stylidium rivulosum
- Stylidium robustum
- Stylidium roseo-alatum : Pink-wing triggerplant
- Stylidium roseonanum
- Stylidium roseum
- Stylidium rotundifolium
- Stylidium rubriscapum
- Stylidium rupestre : Rock triggerplant
- Stylidium sacculatum
- Stylidium scabridum : Moth triggerplant

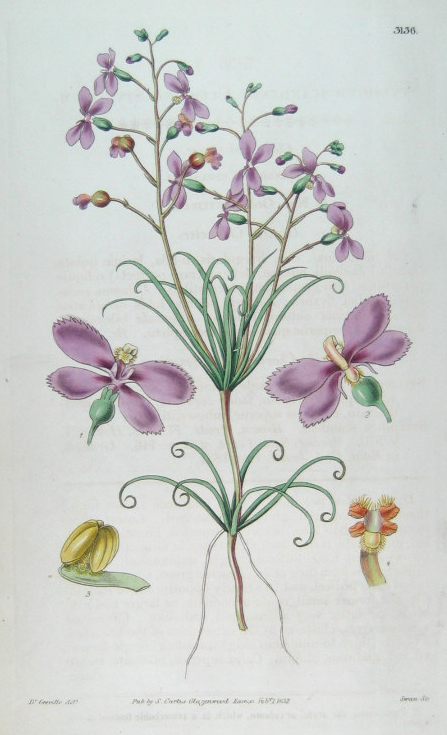
Curtis's Botanical Magazine print of Stylidium scandens.

- Stylidium scandens : Climbing triggerplant
- Stylidium scariosum
- Stylidium schizanthum
- Stylidium schoenoides : Cow Kicks
- Stylidium sejunctum
- Stylidium semaphorum
- Stylidium semipartitum
- Stylidium septentrionale
- Stylidium serrulatum
- Stylidium setaceum
- Stylidium setigerum
- Stylidium sidjamesii
- Stylidium simulans
- Stylidium sinicum
- Stylidium soboliferum
- Stylidium spathulatum : Creamy triggerplant
- Stylidium spinulosum : Topsy-turvy triggerplant
- Stylidium squamellosum : Maze triggerplant
- Stylidium squamosotuberosum : Fleshy-rhizomed triggerplant
- Stylidium stenophyllum
- Stylidium stenosepalum
- Stylidium stipitatum
- Stylidium stowardii
- Stylidium striatum : Fan-leaved triggerplant
- Stylidium subulatum
- Stylidium suffruticosum
- Stylidium sulcatum
- Stylidium symonii
- Stylidium tenellum
- Stylidium tenerrimum
- Stylidium tenerum
- Stylidium tenue
- Stylidium tenuicarpum
- Stylidium tenuifolium
- Stylidium tepperianum
- Stylidium tetrandra
- Stylidium thesioides : Delicate triggerplant
- Stylidium thyrsiforme
- Stylidium tinkeri
- Stylidium torticarpum
- Stylidium trichopodum

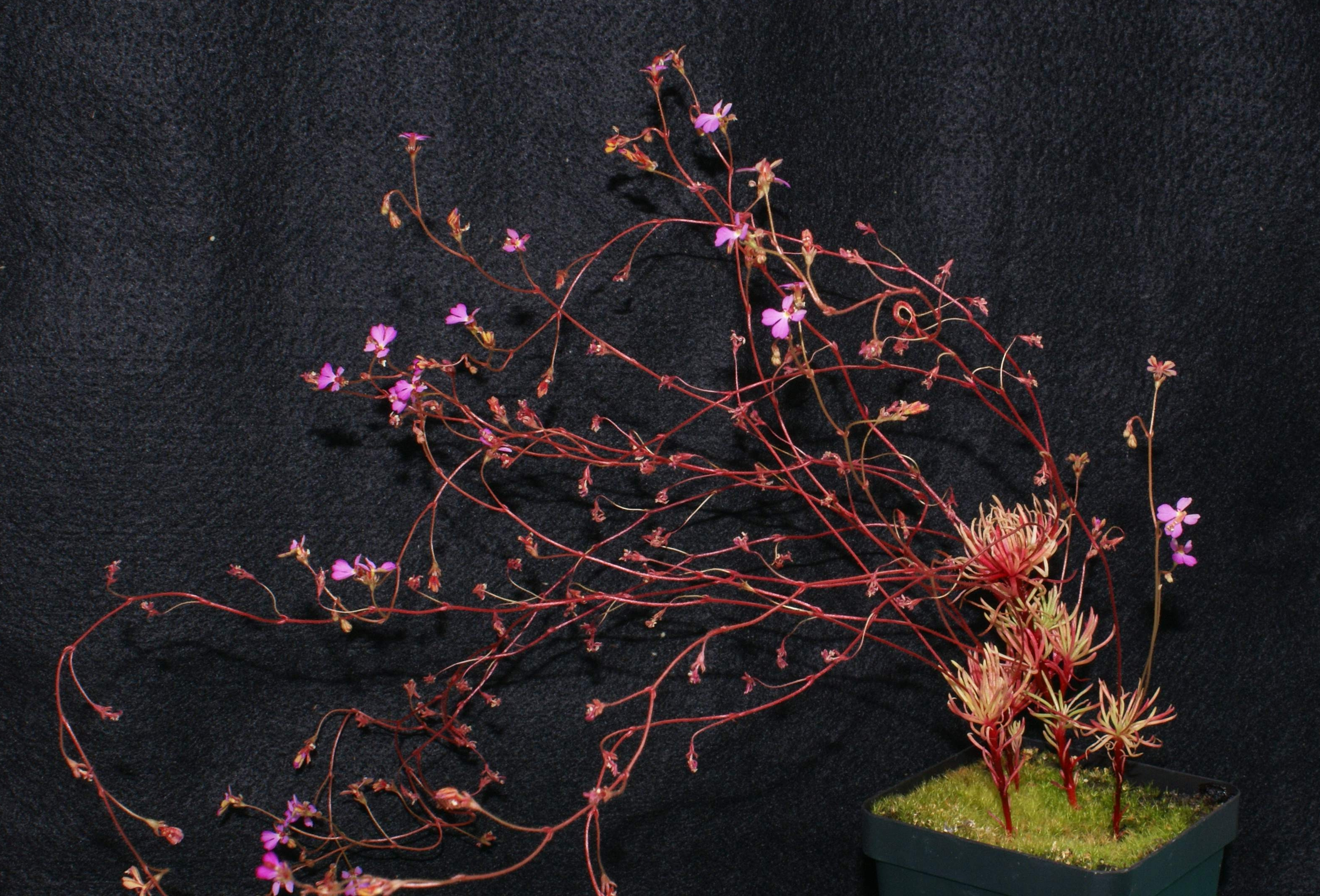
Stylidium turbinatum

- Stylidium turbinatum
- Stylidium tylosum
- Stylidium udusicola
- Stylidium uliginosum
- Stylidium umbellatum
- Stylidium uniflorum : Pincushion triggerplant
- Stylidium utriculariodes : Pink fan triggerplant
- Stylidium validum
- Stylidium velleioides
- Stylidium verticillatum: Pink mountain triggerplant
- Stylidium violaceum : Violet triggerplant
- Stylidium vitiense
- Stylidium warriedarense
- Stylidium weeliwolli
- Stylidium wightianum
- Stylidium wilroyense
- Stylidium xanthopis : Yellow eyed triggerplant
- Stylidium yilgarnense : Yilgarn triggerplant
- Stylidium zeicolor : Maize triggerplant

=== Triantha ===
This genus contains at least 4 species, one of which was reported to be carnivorous in 2021.

- Triantha occidentalis : Western false asphodel

=== Triphyophyllum ===
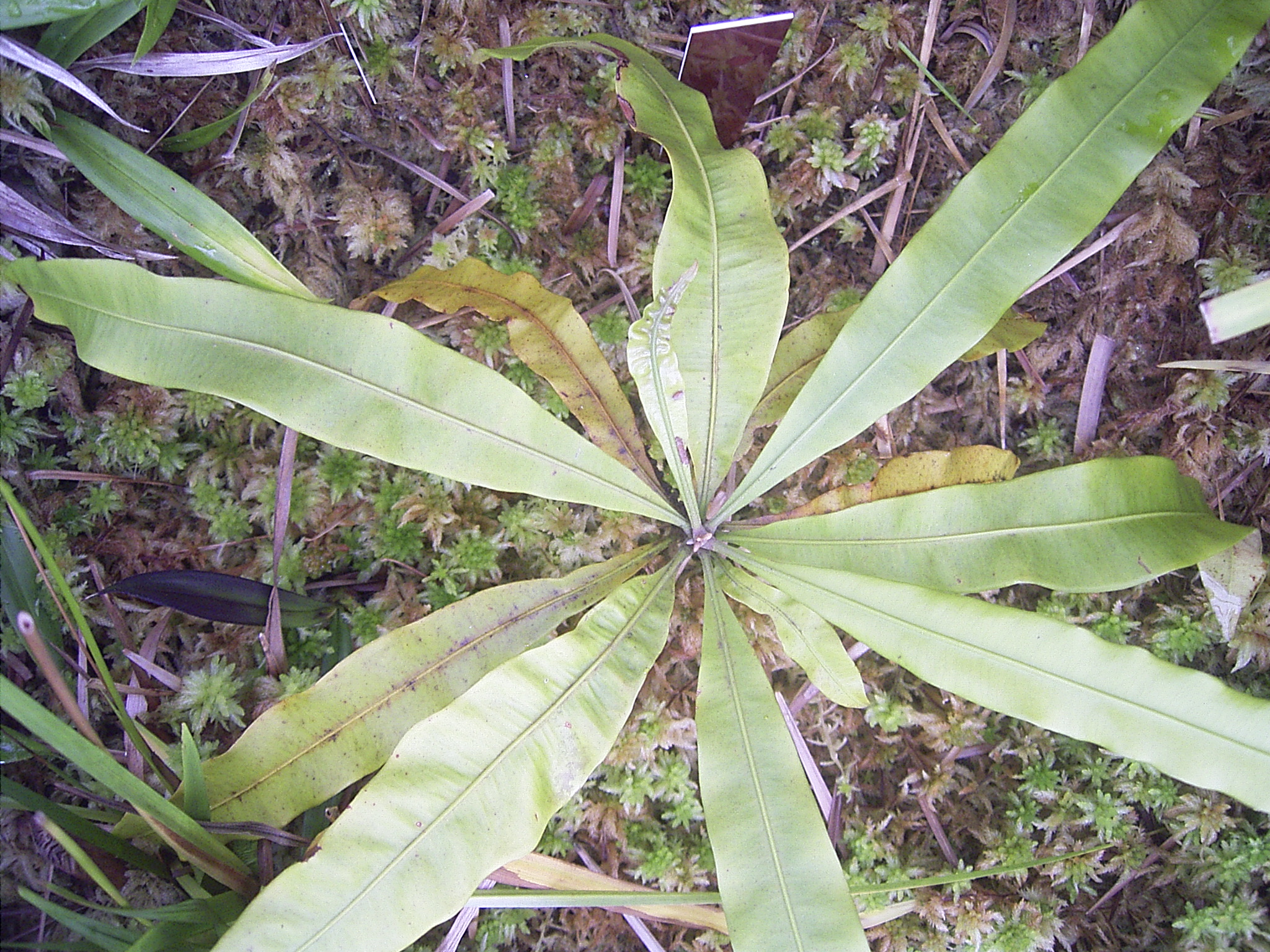
Triphyophyllum peltatum

This genus contains a single extant species.

- Triphyophyllum peltatum (Hutch. & Dalz.) Airy Shaw, 1952 (Bas.: Dioncophyllum peltatum)

=== Utricularia ===
- Utricularia adpressa Salzm. ex A.St.-Hil. & Gir., 1838
- Utricularia albiflora R.Br., 1810
- Utricularia albocaerulea Dalz., 1851
- Utricularia alpina Jacq., 1760
- Utricularia amethystina Salzm. ex A.St.-Hil. & Gir., 1838
- Utricularia andongensis Welw. ex Hiern., 1900
- Utricularia antennifera P.Taylor, 1986
- Utricularia appendiculata E.A.Bruce, 1934
- Utricularia arcuata R.Wight, 1849
- Utricularia arenaria A.DC., 1844
- Utricularia arnhemica P.Taylor, 1986
- Utricularia asplundii P.Taylor, 1975
- Utricularia aurea Lour., 1790
- Utricularia aureomaculata Steyerm., 1953
- Utricularia australis R.Br., 1810
- Utricularia babui Yadav, Sardesai & Gaikwad, 2005
- Utricularia beaugleholei Gassin, 1993
- Utricularia benjaminiana Oliv., 1860
- Utricularia benthamii P.Taylor, 1986
- Utricularia bifida L., 1753
- Utricularia biloba R.Br., 1810
- Utricularia biovularioides (Kuhlm.) P.Taylor, 1986 (Bas.: Saccolaria biovularioides)

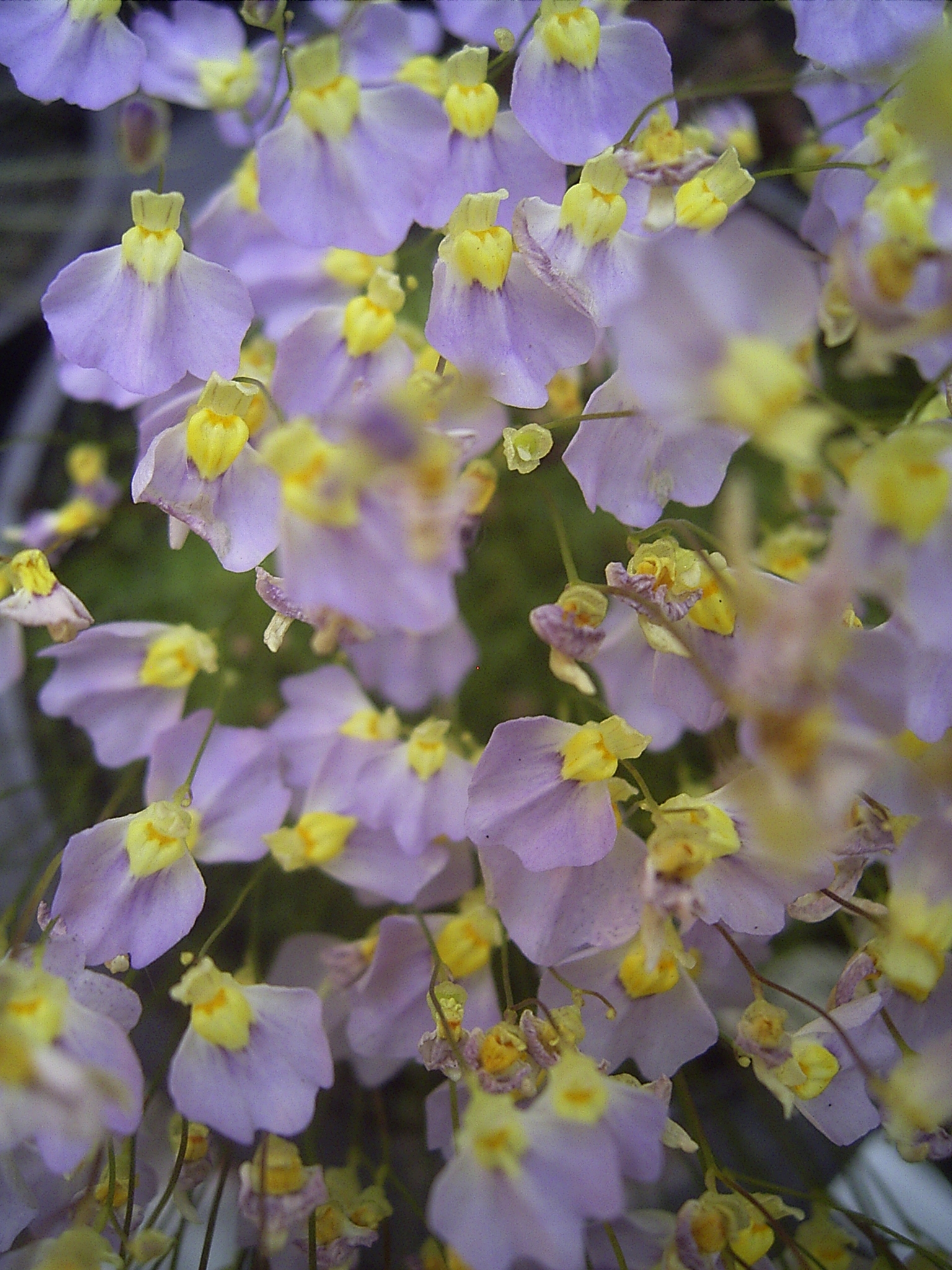
Utricularia bisquamata

- Utricularia bisquamata Schrank, 1824
- Utricularia blackmanii R.W.Jobson, 2012
- Utricularia blanchetii A.DC., 1844
- Utricularia bosminifera Ostenf., 1906
- Utricularia brachiata Oliv., 1859
- Utricularia bracteata R.D.Good, 1924
- Utricularia bremii Heer, 1830
- Utricularia breviscapa Wright ex Griseb., 1866
- Utricularia buntingiana P.Taylor, 1975
- Utricularia caerulea L., 1753
- Utricularia calycifida Benj., 1847
- Utricularia campbelliana Oliv., 1887
- Utricularia capilliflora F.Muell., 1890
- Utricularia cecilii P.Taylor, 1984
- Utricularia cheiranthos P.Taylor, 1986
- Utricularia chiakiana Komiya & C.Shibata, 1997
- Utricularia chiribiquitensis Fernandez-Perez, 1964
- Utricularia choristotheca P.Taylor, 1986
- Utricularia christopheri P.Taylor, 1986
- Utricularia chrysantha R.Br., 1810
- Utricularia circumvoluta P.Taylor, 1986
- Utricularia cochleata C.P.Bove, 2008
- Utricularia cornigera Studnička, 2009
- Utricularia cornuta Michx., 1803
- Utricularia corynephora P.Taylor, 1986
- Utricularia costata P.Taylor, 1986
- Utricularia cucullata A.St.-Hil. & Gir., 1838
- Utricularia cymbantha Welw. ex Oliv., 1865
- Utricularia delicatula Cheesem., 1906
- Utricularia delphinioides Thorel ex Pellegr., 1920
- Utricularia densiflora Baleeiro & C.P.Bove, 2011
- Utricularia determannii P.Taylor, 1986

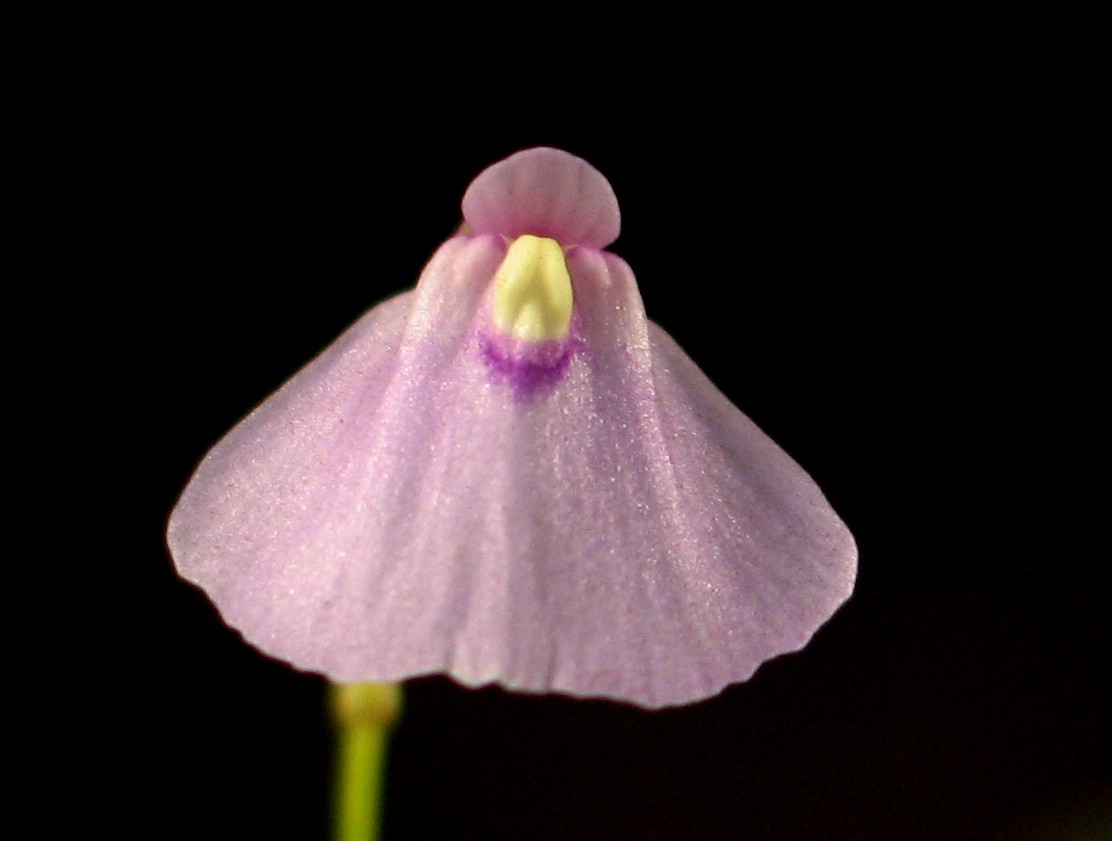
Utricularia dichotoma

- Utricularia dichotoma Labill., 1804
- Utricularia dimorphantha Makino, 1906
- Utricularia dunlopii P.Taylor, 1986
- Utricularia dunstaniae F.E.Lloyd, 1936
- Utricularia endresii Rchb.f., 1874
- Utricularia erectiflora A.St.-Hil. & Gir., 1838
- Utricularia fimbriata H.B.K., 1818
- Utricularia firmula Welw. ex Oliv., 1865
- Utricularia fistulosa P.Taylor, 1986
- Utricularia flaccida A.DC., 1844
- Utricularia floridana Nash, 1896
- Utricularia foliosa L., 1753
- Utricularia forrestii P.Taylor, 1986
- Utricularia foveolata Edgew., 1847
- Utricularia fulva F.Muell., 1858
- Utricularia furcellata Oliv., 1859
- Utricularia garrettii P.Taylor, 1986
- Utricularia geminiloba Benj., 1847
- Utricularia geminiscapa Benj., 1847
- Utricularia geoffrayi Pellegr., 1920
- Utricularia georgei P.Taylor, 1986
- Utricularia gibba L., 1753
- Utricularia graminifolia Vahl, 1804
- Utricularia guyanensis A.DC., 1844
- Utricularia hamiltonii F.E.Lloyd, 1936
- Utricularia helix P.Taylor, 1986
- Utricularia heterochroma Steyerm., 1953
- Utricularia heterosepala Benj., 1847
- Utricularia hintonii P.Taylor, 1986
- Utricularia hirta Klein ex Link, 1820
- Utricularia hispida Lam., 1791
- Utricularia holtzei F.Muell., 1893
- Utricularia humboldtii Schomb., 1841
- Utricularia huntii P.Taylor, 1986
- Utricularia hydrocarpa Vahl, 1804
- Utricularia inaequalis A.DC., 1844
- Utricularia incisa (A.Rich.) Alain, 1956 (Bas.: Drosera incisa)

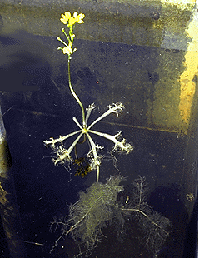
Utricularia inflata

- Utricularia inflata Walt., 1788
- Utricularia inflexa Forsk., 1775
- Utricularia intermedia Hayne, 1800
- Utricularia inthanonensis Suksathan & J.Parn., 2010
- Utricularia involvens Ridl., 1895
- Utricularia jackii J. Parn., 2005
- Utricularia jamesoniana Oliv., 1860
- Utricularia jobsonii Lowrie, 2013
- Utricularia juncea Vahl, 1804
- Utricularia kamienskii F.Muell., 1893
- Utricularia kenneallyi P.Taylor, 1986
- Utricularia kimberleyensis C.A.Gardn., 1930
- Utricularia kumaonensis Oliv., 1859
- Utricularia laciniata A.St.-Hil. & Gir., 1838
- Utricularia lasiocaulis F.Muell., 1885
- Utricularia lateriflora R.Br., 1810
- Utricularia laxa A.St.-Hil. & Gir., 1838
- Utricularia lazulina P.Taylor, 1984
- Utricularia leptoplectra F.Muell., 1885
- Utricularia leptorhyncha Schwarz, 1927
- Utricularia letestui P.Taylor, 1989
- Utricularia limosa R.Br., 1810
- Utricularia linearis Wakabayashi, 2010
- Utricularia livida E.Mey., 1837
- Utricularia lloydii Merl ex F.E.Lloyd, 1932
- Utricularia longeciliata A.DC., 1844
- Utricularia longifolia Gardn., 1842
- Utricularia macrocheilos (P.Taylor) P.Taylor, 1986 (Bas.: Utricularia micropetala var.macrocheilos)
- Utricularia macrorhiza Le Conte, 1824
- Utricularia malabarica Janarthanam & Henry, 1989
- Utricularia mangshanensis G.W.Hu, 2007
- Utricularia mannii Oliv., 1865
- Utricularia menziesii R.Br., 1810
- Utricularia meyeri Pilger, 1901
- Utricularia microcalyx (P.Taylor) P.Taylor, 1971 (Bas.: Utricularia welwitschii var.microcalyx)
- Utricularia micropetala Sm., 1819

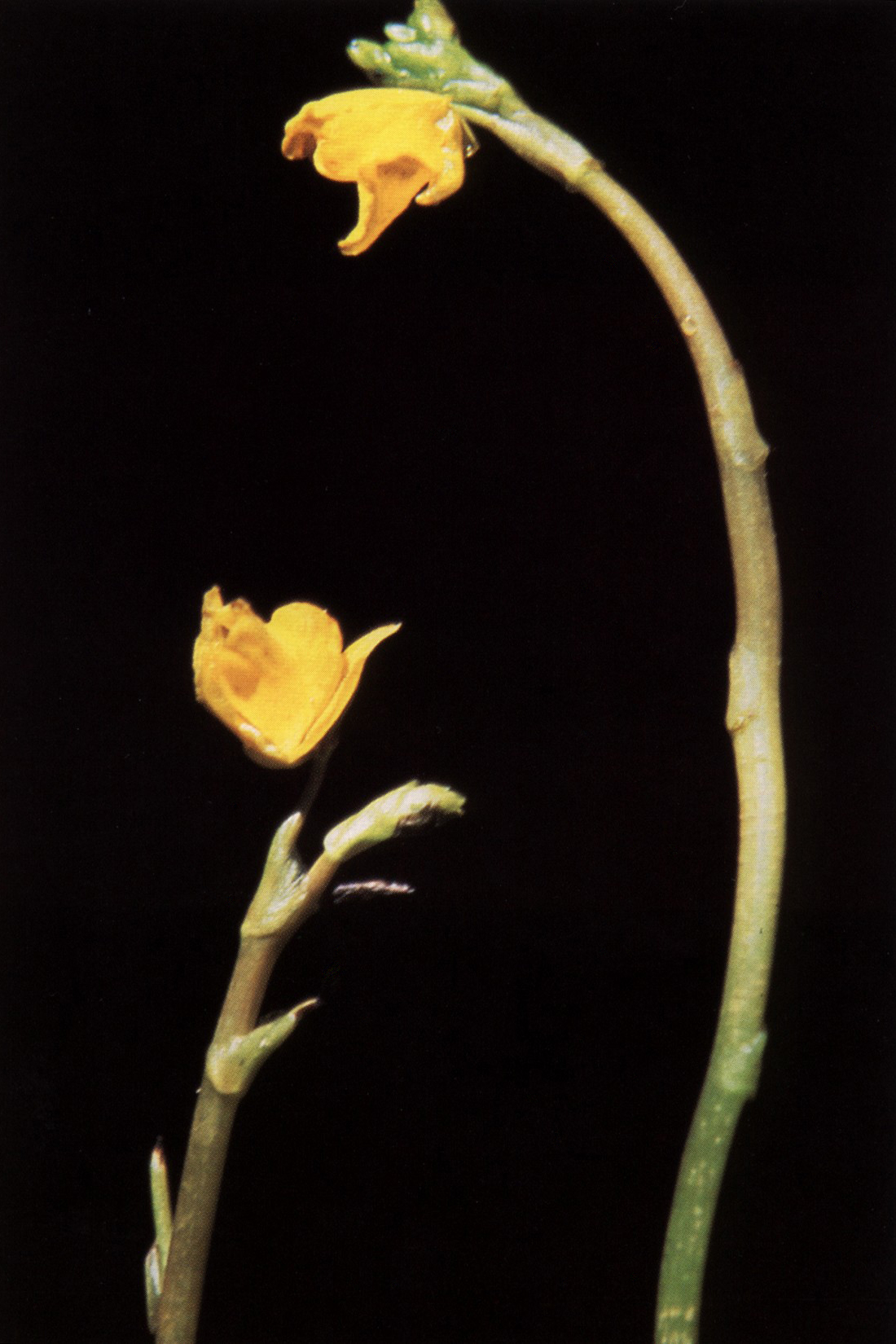
Utricularia minor

- Utricularia minor L., 1753
- Utricularia minutissima Vahl, 1804
- Utricularia mirabilis P.Taylor, 1986
- Utricularia moniliformis P.Taylor, 1986
- Utricularia muelleri Kam., 1894
- Utricularia multicaulis Oliv., 1859
- Utricularia multifida R.Br., 1810
- Utricularia myriocista A.St.-Hil. & Gir., 1838
- Utricularia nana A.St.-Hil. & Gir., 1838
- Utricularia naviculata P.Taylor, 1967
- Utricularia nelumbifolia Gardn., 1852
- Utricularia neottioides A.St.-Hil. & Gir., 1838
- Utricularia nephrophylla Benj., 1847
- Utricularia nervosa G.Weber ex Benj., 1847
- Utricularia nigrescens Sylven, 1909
- Utricularia ochroleuca Hartm., 1857
- Utricularia odontosepala Stapf, 1912
- Utricularia odorata Pellegr., 1920
- Utricularia olivacea Wright ex Griseb., 1866
- Utricularia oliveriana Steyerm., 1953
- Utricularia panamensis Steyerm. ex P.Taylor, 1986
- Utricularia parthenopipes P.Taylor, 1986
- Utricularia paulineae Lowrie, 1998
- Utricularia pentadactyla P.Taylor, 1954
- Utricularia peranomala P.Taylor, 1986
- Utricularia perversa P.Taylor, 1986
- Utricularia petersoniae P.Taylor, 1986
- Utricularia petertaylorii A.Lowrie, 2002
- Utricularia phusoidaoensis Suksathan & J.Parn., 2010
- Utricularia physoceras P.Taylor, 1986
- Utricularia pierrei Pellegr., 1920
- Utricularia platensis Speg., 1899
- Utricularia pobeguinii Pellegr., 1914
- Utricularia poconensis Fromm, 1985
- Utricularia podadena P.Taylor, 1964
- Utricularia polygaloides Edgew., 1847
- Utricularia praelonga A.St.-Hil. & Gir., 1838
- Utricularia praeterita P.Taylor, 1983
- Utricularia praetermissa P.Taylor, 1976
- Utricularia prehensilis E.Mey., 1837
- Utricularia pubescens Sm., 1819
- Utricularia pulchra P.Taylor, 1977
- Utricularia punctata Wall. ex A.DC., 1844
- Utricularia purpurea Wlat., 1788
- Utricularia purpureocaerulea A.St.-Hil. & Gir., 1838
- Utricularia pusilla Vahl, 1804
- Utricularia quelchii N.E.Br., 1901
- Utricularia quinquedentata F.Muell. ex P.Taylor, 1986
- Utricularia radiata Small, 1903
- Utricularia raynalii P.Taylor, 1986
- Utricularia recta P.Taylor, 1986
- Utricularia reflexa Oliv., 1865
- Utricularia regia Zamudio & Olvera, 2009
- Utricularia reniformis A.St.-Hil., 1830
- Utricularia resupinata Greene, 1840
- Utricularia reticulata Sm., 1805
- Utricularia rhododactylos P.Taylor, 1986
- Utricularia rigida Benj., 1847
- Utricularia rostrata A.Fleischm. & Rivadavia, 2009
- Utricularia salwinensis Hand.-Mazz., 1936

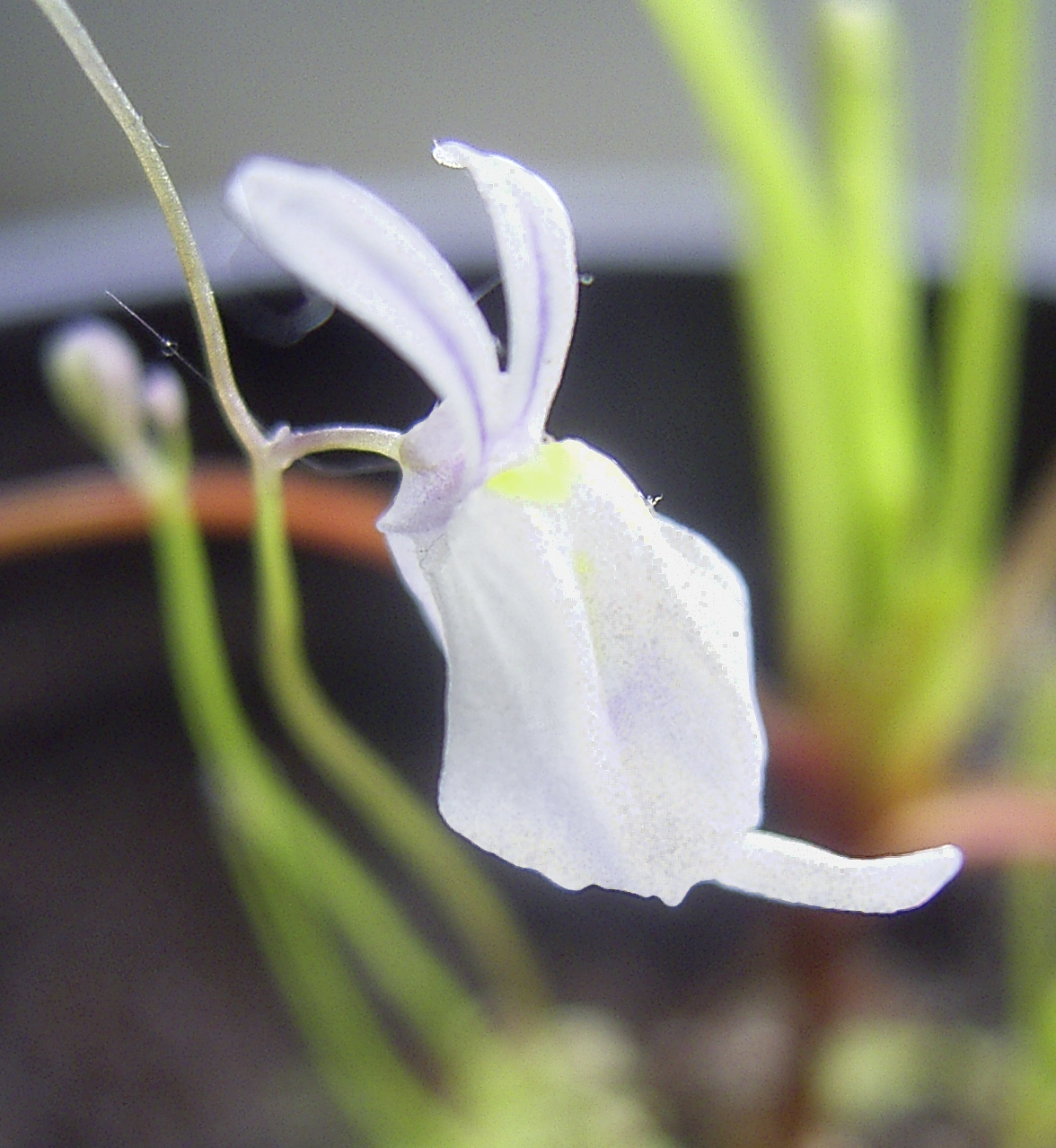
Utricularia sandersonii

- Utricularia sandersonii Oliv., 1865
- Utricularia sandwithii P.Taylor, 1967
- Utricularia scandens Benj., 1847
- Utricularia schultesii Fernandez-Perez, 1964
- Utricularia simmonsii Lowrie, Cowie & Conran, 2008
- Utricularia simplex R.Br., 1810
- Utricularia simulans Pilger, 1914
- Utricularia singeriana F.Muell., 1891
- Utricularia smithiana R.Wight, 1849
- Utricularia spiralis Sm., 1819
- Utricularia spinomarginata Suksathan & J.Parn., 2010
- Utricularia spruceana Benth. ex Oliv., 1860
- Utricularia stanfieldii P.Taylor, 1963
- Utricularia steenisii P.Taylor, 1986
- Utricularia stellaris L.f., 1781
- Utricularia steyermarkii P.Taylor, 1967
- Utricularia striata Le Conte ex Torr., 1819
- Utricularia striatula Sm., 1819
- Utricularia stygia Thor, 1988
- Utricularia subramanyamii Janarthanam & Henry, 1989
- Utricularia subulata L., 1753
- Utricularia tenella R.Br., 1810
- Utricularia tenuissima Tutin, 1934
- Utricularia terrae-reginae P.Taylor, 1986
- Utricularia tetraloba P.Taylor, 1963
- Utricularia tortilis Welw. ex Oliv., 1865
- Utricularia trichophylla Spruce ex Oliv., 1860
- Utricularia tricolor A.St.-Hil., 1833
- Utricularia tridactyla P.Taylor, 1986
- Utricularia tridentata Sylven, 1909
- Utricularia triflora P.Taylor, 1986
- Utricularia triloba Benj., 1847
- Utricularia troupinii P.Taylor, 1971
- Utricularia tubulata F.Muell., 1875
- Utricularia uliginosa Vahl, 1804
- Utricularia uniflora R.Br., 1810
- Utricularia unifolia Ruiz & Pav., 1797
- Utricularia uxoris Gómez-Laur., 2005
- Utricularia violacea R.Br., 1810
- Utricularia viscosa Spruce ex Oliv., 1860
- Utricularia vitellina Ridl., 1923
- Utricularia volubilis R.Br., 1810
- Utricularia vulgaris L., 1753

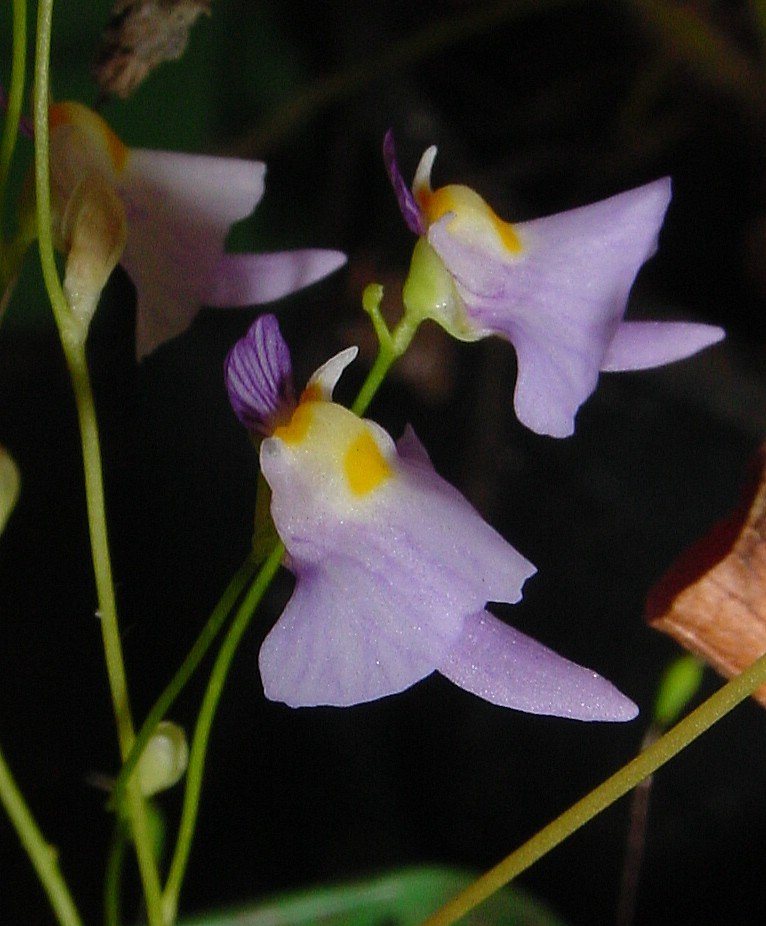
Utricularia warburgii

- Utricularia warburgii Goebel, 1891
- Utricularia warmingii Kam., 1894
- Utricularia welwitschii Oliv., 1865
- Utricularia westonii P.Taylor, 1986
- Utricularia wightiana P.Taylor, 1986

== Extinct species ==
=== Aldrovanda ===
Numerous extinct species of Aldrovanda have been described, all of which are known only from fossil pollen and seeds (with the exception of A. inopinata, which is also known from fossilised laminae).

- †Aldrovanda borysthenica
- †Aldrovanda clavata
- †Aldrovanda dokturovskyi
- †Aldrovanda eleanorae
- †Aldrovanda europaea
- †Aldrovanda inopinata
- †Aldrovanda intermedia
- †Aldrovanda kuprianovae
- †Aldrovanda megalopolitana
- †Aldrovanda nana
- †Aldrovanda ovata
- †Aldrovanda praevesiculosa
- †Aldrovanda rugosa
- †Aldrovanda sibirica
- †Aldrovanda sobolevii
- †Aldrovanda unica
- †Aldrovanda zussii

=== †Archaeamphora ===
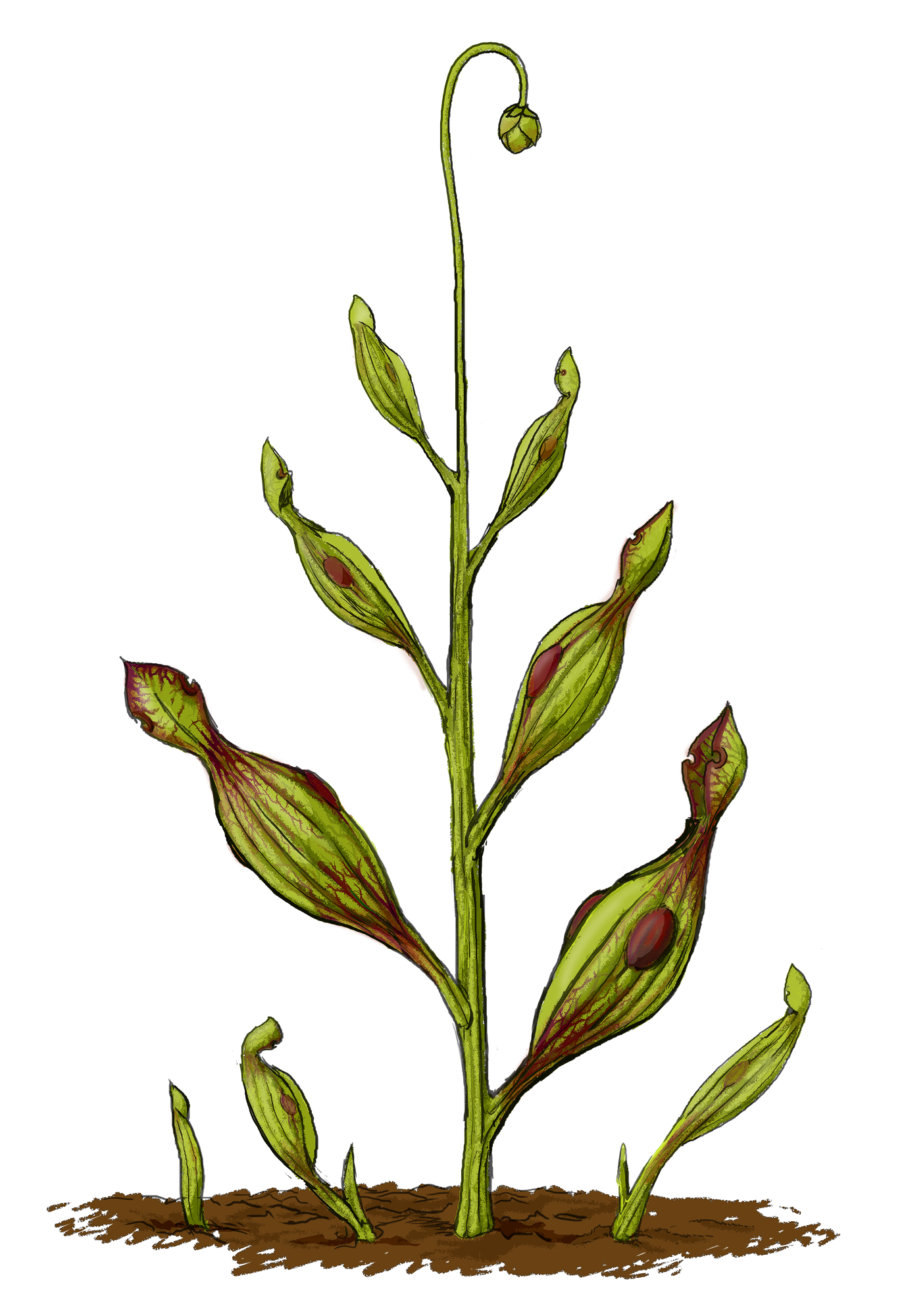
Artist's restoration of Archaeamphora longicervia.

This genus contains a single extinct species, described from fossilised leaf material. The identification of Archaeamphora as a pitcher plant (and therefore carnivorous plant) has been questioned by a number of authors, speculating that it could caused by Gall-inducing insects.

- †Archaeamphora longicervia Li, 2005

=== †Droserapites ===
This is a form taxon known only from fossil pollen.

- †Droserapites clavatus Huang, 1978

=== †Droserapollis ===
This is a form taxon known only from fossil pollen.

- †Droserapollis gemmatus Huang, 1978
- †Droserapollis khasiensis Kumar, 1995
- †Droserapollis lusaticus (Krutzsch, 1959)
- †Droserapollis taiwanensis Shaw, 1999

=== †Droseridites ===
This is a form taxon known only from fossil pollen. Three species of the "Droseridites echinosporus group" have been transferred to the genus Nepenthes (see below).

- †Droseridites baculatus Ibrahim, 1996
- †Droseridites parvus Dutta & Sah, 1970
- †Droseridites senonicus Jardiné & Magloire, 1965
- †Droseridites spinosus (Cookson) R.Potonié, 1960

=== †Fischeripollis ===
This is a form taxon known only from fossil pollen.

- †Fischeripollis halensis Truswell & Marchant, 2051
- †Fischeripollis krutschei Muller, 2039
- †Fischeripollis undulatus

=== Nepenthes ===
Three species known only from fossil pollen and originally assigned to Droseridites have been transferred to the genus Nepenthes.

- †Nepenthes echinatus (Hunger) Krutzsch, 1985
- †Nepenthes echinosporus (R.Potonié) Krutzsch, 1985
- †Nepenthes major (Krutzsch) Krutzsch, 1985

=== †Nepenthidites ===
This is a form taxon known only from fossil pollen. Droseridites major (Nepenthes major) and Droseridites parvus are considered synonyms of Nepenthidites laitryngewensis by some authorities.

- †Nepenthidites laitryngewensis Kumar, 1995

=== †Palaeoaldrovanda ===
This is a form taxon known only from what were originally described as fossil seeds. These supposed seeds have subsequently been identified as insect eggs.

- †Palaeoaldrovanda splendens Knobloch & Mai, 1984

=== †Saxonipollis ===
This is a form taxon known only from fossil pollen.

- †Saxonipollis saxonicus Krutzsch, 1970

== See also ==
- List of Nepenthes natural hybrids
- Nepenthes classification
