= Carnivorous plants of Australia =

List of Australian plants with carnivorous lifestyle

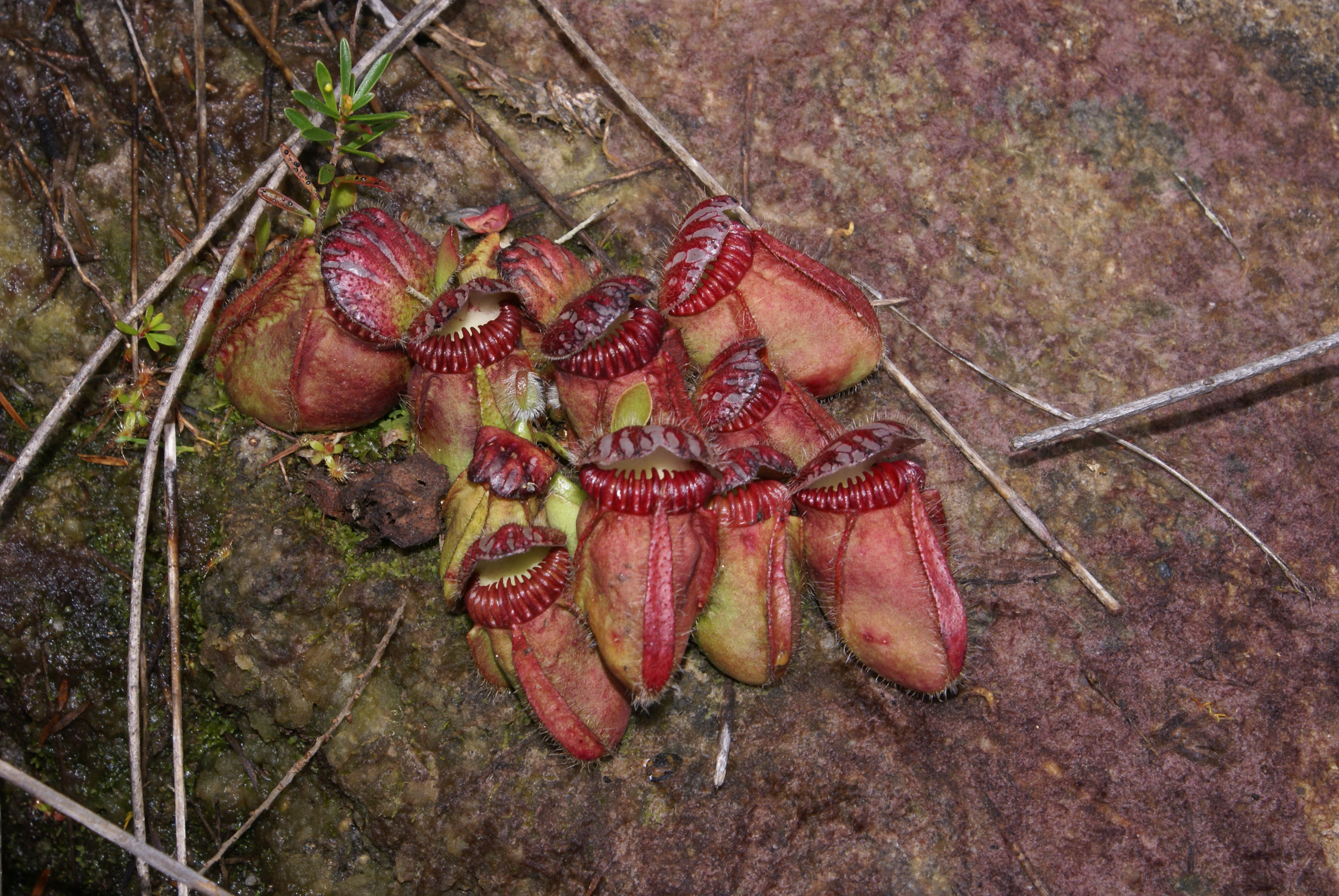
Cephalotus follicularis, a low growing pitcher plant endemic to Southwest Australia

Australia has one of the world's richest carnivorous plant floras, with around 187 recognised species from 6 genera.

== Species ==
The following list is derived from Australian Carnivorous Plants (2012) by Greg Bourke and Richard Nunn. It notably excludes the genus Stylidium, whose members may be considered to be protocarnivorous or carnivorous because the glandular trichomes that cover the scape and flower can trap, kill, and digest small insects with protease enzymes produced by the plant.

Aldrovanda (1 species)

- Aldrovanda vesiculosa

Byblis (8 species; endemic)

- Byblis aquatica
- Byblis filifolia
- Byblis gigantea
- Byblis guehoi
- Byblis lamellata
- Byblis liniflora
- Byblis pilbarana
- Byblis rorida

Cephalotus (1 species; endemic)

- Cephalotus follicularis

Drosera (117 species)

- Drosera aberrans
- Drosera adelae
- Drosera allantostigma
- Drosera andersoniana
- Drosera androsacea
- Drosera arcturi
- Drosera auriculata
- Drosera banksii
- Drosera barbigera
- Drosera binata
- Drosera brevicornis
- Drosera broomensis
- Drosera browniana
- Drosera bulbigena
- Drosera bulbosa
- Drosera burmanni
- Drosera buubugujin
- Drosera caduca
- Drosera callistos
- Drosera capensis
- Drosera citrina
- Drosera closterostigma
- Drosera darwinensis
- Drosera derbyensis
- Drosera dichrosepala
- Drosera dilatatopetiolaris
- Drosera echinoblastus
- Drosera eneabba
- Drosera erythrogyne
- Drosera erythrorhiza
- Drosera falconeri
- Drosera fimbriata
- Drosera fulva
- Drosera gibsonii
- Drosera gigantea
- Drosera glanduligera
- Drosera grievei
- Drosera hamiltonii
- Drosera hartmeyerorum
- Drosera helodes
- Drosera heterophylla
- Drosera hookeri
- Drosera huegelii
- Drosera humilis
- Drosera hyperostigma
- Drosera indica
- Drosera intricata
- Drosera kenneallyi
- Drosera lanata
- Drosera lasiantha
- Drosera leioblastus
- Drosera leucoblasta
- Drosera leucostigma
- Drosera lowriei
- Drosera macrantha
- Drosera macrophylla
- Drosera mannii
- Drosera marchantii
- Drosera menziesii
- Drosera microphylla
- Drosera microscapa
- Drosera miniata
- Drosera modesta
- Drosera monticola
- Drosera moorei
- Drosera myriantha
- Drosera neesii
- Drosera nitidula
- Drosera occidentalis
- Drosera omissa
- Drosera orbiculata
- Drosera ordensis
- Drosera oreopodion
- Drosera paleacea
- Drosera pallida
- Drosera paradoxa
- Drosera parvula
- Drosera patens
- Drosera pedicellaris
- Drosera peltata
- Drosera petiolaris
- Drosera platypoda
- Drosera platystigma
- Drosera porrecta
- Drosera praefolia
- Drosera prolifera
- Drosera prostrata
- Drosera prostratoscaposa
- Drosera pulchella
- Drosera purpurascens
- Drosera pycnoblasta
- Drosera pygmaea
- Drosera radicans
- Drosera ramellosa
- Drosera rechingeri
- Drosera roseana
- Drosera rosulata
- Drosera rupicola
- Drosera salina
- Drosera sargentii
- Drosera schizandra
- Drosera schmutzii
- Drosera scorpioides
- Drosera sewelliae
- Drosera spatulata
- Drosera spilos
- Drosera stelliflora
- Drosera stolonifera
- Drosera stricticaulis
- Drosera subhirtella
- Drosera subtilis
- Drosera sulphurea
- Drosera tubaestylis
- Drosera walyunga
- Drosera whittakeri
- Drosera zigzagia
- Drosera zonaria

Nepenthes (4 species)

- Nepenthes mirabilis
- Nepenthes parvula
- Nepenthes rowaniae
- Nepenthes tenax

Utricularia (58 species)

- Utricularia antennifera
- Utricularia arnhemica
- Utricularia aurea
- Utricularia australis
- Utricularia beaugleholei
- Utricularia benthamii
- Utricularia bifida
- Utricularia biloba
- Utricularia caerulea
- Utricularia capilliflora
- Utricularia cheiranthos
- Utricularia chrysantha
- Utricularia circumvoluta
- Utricularia dichotoma
- Utricularia dunlopii
- Utricularia dunstaniae
- Utricularia fistulosa
- Utricularia foveolata
- Utricularia fulva
- Utricularia georgei
- Utricularia gibba
- Utricularia hamiltonii
- Utricularia helix
- Utricularia holtzei
- Utricularia inaequalis
- Utricularia involvens
- Utricularia kamienskii
- Utricularia kenneallyi
- Utricularia kimberleyensis
- Utricularia lasiocaulis
- Utricularia lateriflora
- Utricularia leptoplectra
- Utricularia leptorhyncha
- Utricularia limosa
- Utricularia menziesii
- Utricularia minutissima
- Utricularia muelleri
- Utricularia multifida
- Utricularia odorata
- Utricularia paulineae
- Utricularia petertaylorii
- Utricularia quinquedentata
- Utricularia rhododactylos
- Utricularia simmonsii
- Utricularia simplex
- Utricularia singeriana
- Utricularia stellaris
- Utricularia subulata
- Utricularia tenella
- Utricularia terrae-reginae
- Utricularia tridactyla
- Utricularia triflora
- Utricularia tubulata
- Utricularia uliginosa
- Utricularia uniflora
- Utricularia violacea
- Utricularia volubilis
- Utricularia westonii

== See also ==
- Carnivorous plants of New Zealand
