= Utricularia quinquedentata =

Conservation status
- Least Concern (IUCN 3.1)

Scientific classification
- Kingdom: Plantae
- Clade: Tracheophytes
- Clade: Angiosperms
- Clade: Eudicots
- Clade: Asterids
- Order: Lamiales
- Family: Lentibulariaceae
- Genus: Utricularia
- Subgenus: Utricularia subg. Polypompholyx
- Section: Utricularia sect. Pleiochasia
- Species: U. quinquedentata

Binomial name
- Utricularia quinquedentata F.Muell. ex P.Taylor

Synonyms
- U. albiflora var. quinquedentata F.Muell.

Species of carnivorous plant

Utricularia quinquedentata is an annual, terrestrial carnivorous plant that belongs to the genus Utricularia (family Lentibulariaceae). Its distribution ranges across northern Australia from Western Australia to northern Queensland and south to Brisbane. It was first identified by Ferdinand von Mueller as possibly a new species or variety in the early 1890s, noting it as "U. albiflora or a closely allied species." Mueller labeled one herbarium sheet as Utricularia albiflora var. quinquedentata. Without a valid description, according to the rules of botanical nomenclature, however, the epithet quinquedentata was not recognized until Peter Taylor validly published the species in 1986.

== See also ==
- List of Utricularia species
