= Utricularia ameliae =

Scientific classification
- Kingdom: Plantae
- Clade: Tracheophytes
- Clade: Angiosperms
- Clade: Eudicots
- Clade: Asterids
- Order: Lamiales
- Family: Lentibulariaceae
- Genus: Utricularia
- Subgenus: Utricularia subg. Polypompholyx
- Section: Utricularia sect. Pleiochasia
- Species: U. ameliae

Binomial name
- Utricularia ameliae R.W.Jobson (2013)

Species of carnivorous plant

Utricularia ameliae is a terrestrial carnivorous plant belonging to the genus Utricularia (family Lentibulariaceae). It is only known from the discharge mound spring habitats of far western Queensland, Australia.

== See also ==
- List of Utricularia species
