= List of Utricularia species =

There are around 240 species in the genus Utricularia, belonging to the bladderwort family (Lentibulariaceae). It is the largest genus of carnivorous plants and has a worldwide distribution, being absent only from Antarctica and the oceanic islands. This genus was considered to have 250 species until Peter Taylor reduced the number to 214 in his exhaustive study, The genus Utricularia - a taxonomic monograph, published by HMSO (1989). Taylor's classification is generally accepted, though his division of the genus into two subgenera was soon seen as obsolete. Molecular genetic studies have mostly confirmed Taylor's sections with some modifications (Jobson et al., 2003), but reinstalled the division of the genus in three subgenera. This list follows the subgeneric classification sensu Müller & Borsch (2005), updated with new information in Müller et al. (2006).

For a list of known Utricularia species by common name, see Utricularia species by common name.

== Subgenus Bivalvaria ==
=== Section Aranella ===
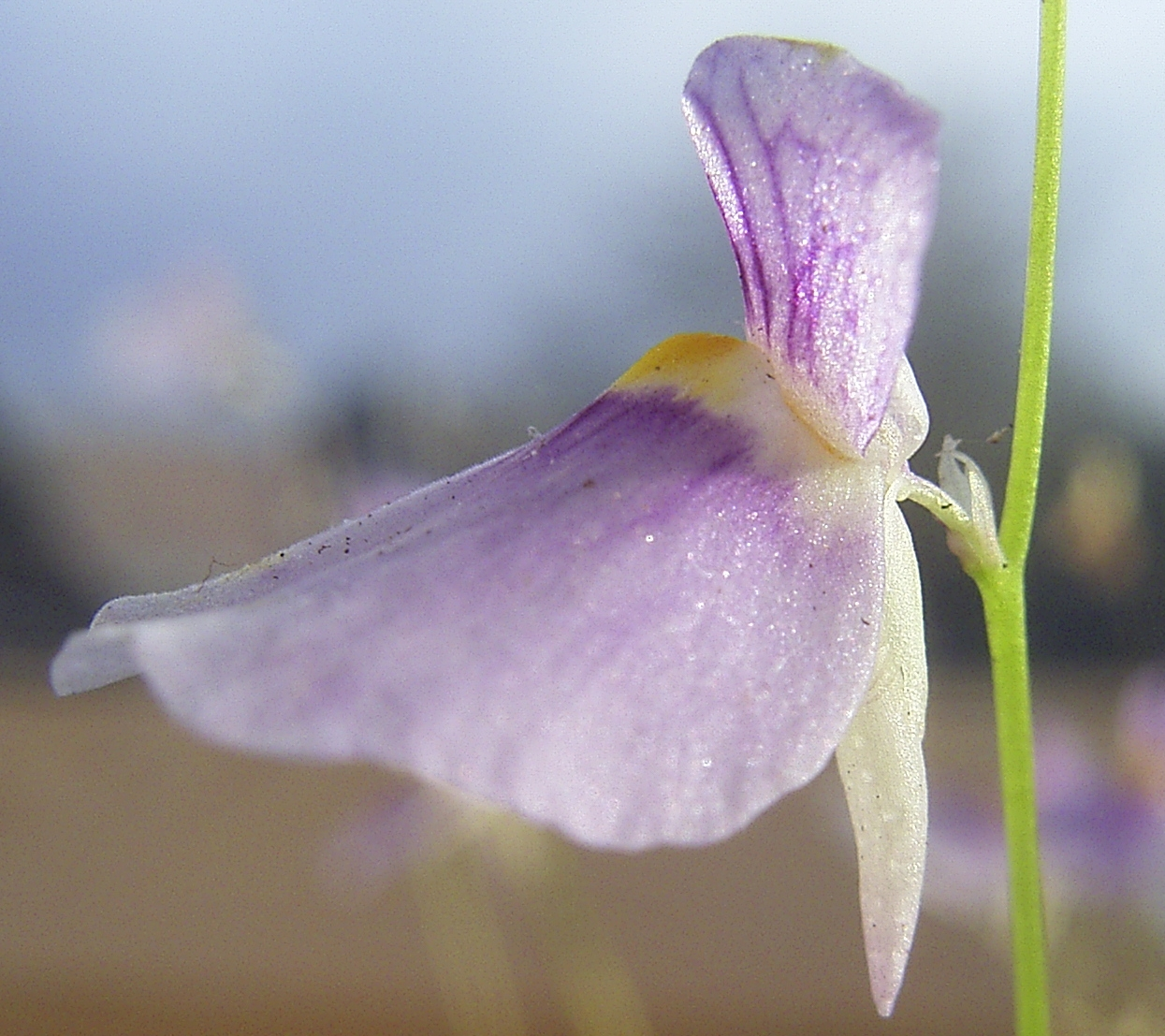
Utricularia blanchetii

- Utricularia blanchetii
- Utricularia costata
- Utricularia fimbriata
- Utricularia laciniata
- Utricularia longeciliata
- Utricularia parthenopipes
- Utricularia purpureocaerulea
- Utricularia rostrata
- Utricularia sandwithii
- Utricularia simulans

=== Section Australes ===
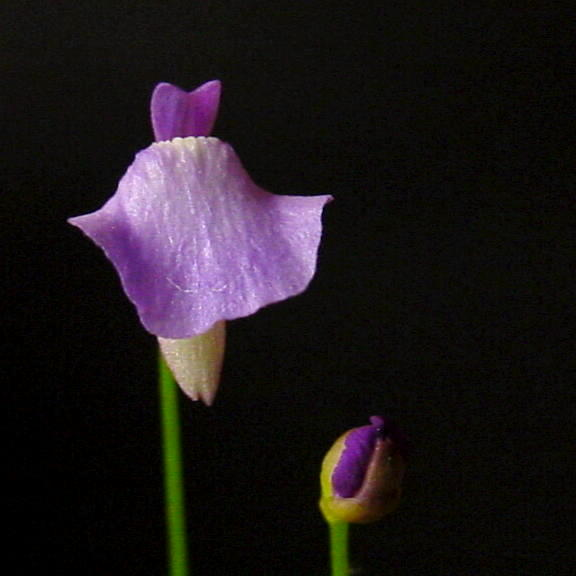
Utricularia lateriflora

- Utricularia delicatula
- Utricularia lateriflora
- Utricularia simplex

=== Section Avesicarioides ===
- Utricularia rigida
- Utricularia tetraloba

=== Section Benjaminia ===
- Utricularia nana

=== Section Calpidisca ===
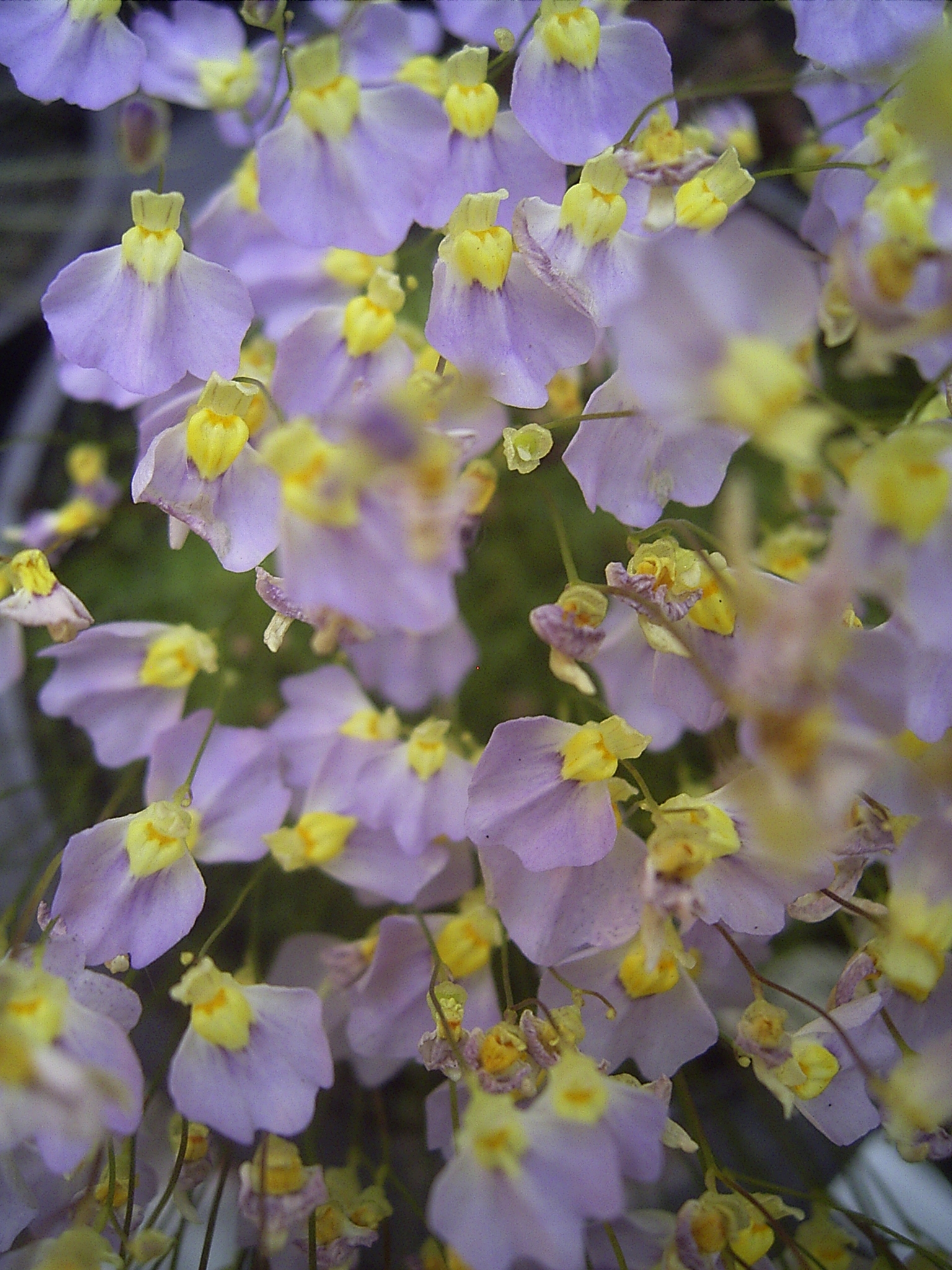
Utricularia bisquamata

- Utricularia arenaria
- Utricularia bisquamata
- Utricularia firmula
- Utricularia livida
- Utricularia microcalyx
- Utricularia odontosepala
- Utricularia pentadactyla
- Utricularia sandersonii
- Utricularia troupinii
- Utricularia welwitschii

=== Section Enskide ===
- Utricularia chrysantha
- Utricularia fulva

=== Section Lloydia ===
- Utricularia pubescens

=== Section Minutae ===
- Utricularia simmonsii

=== Section Nigrescentes ===
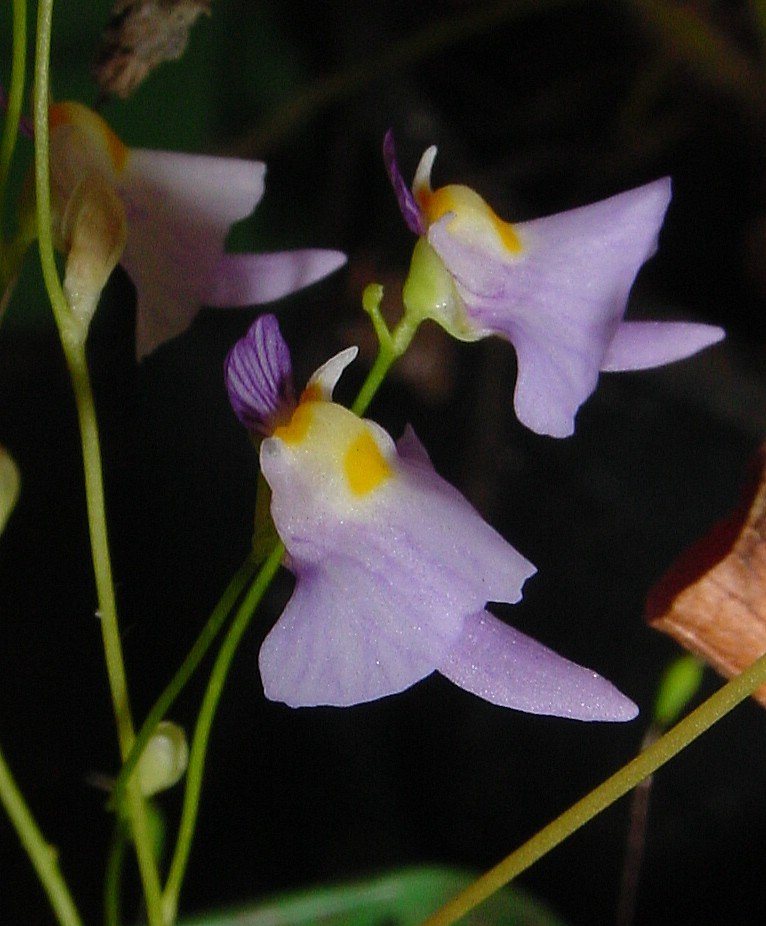
Utricularia warburgii

- Utricularia bracteata
- Utricularia caerulea
- Utricularia warburgii

=== Section Oligocista ===
- Utricularia adpressa
- Utricularia albocaerulea
- Utricularia andongensis
- Utricularia arcuata
- Utricularia babui
- Utricularia bifida
- Utricularia bosminifera
- Utricularia cecilii
- Utricularia chiribiquitensis
- Utricularia circumvoluta
- Utricularia delphinioides
- Utricularia densiflora
- Utricularia erectiflora
- Utricularia foveolata
- Utricularia graminifolia
- Utricularia heterosepala
- Utricularia involvens
- Utricularia jackii
- Utricularia laxa
- Utricularia lazulina
- Utricularia letestui
- Utricularia lloydii
- Utricularia macrocheilos
- Utricularia malabarica
- Utricularia meyeri
- Utricularia micropetala
- Utricularia odorata
- Utricularia pierrei
- Utricularia pobeguinii
- Utricularia polygaloides
- Utricularia praeterita
- Utricularia prehensilis
- Utricularia recta
- Utricularia reticulata
- Utricularia scandens
- Utricularia smithiana
- Utricularia spiralis
- Utricularia subramanyamii
- Utricularia tortilis
- Utricularia uliginosa
- Utricularia vitellina
- Utricularia wightiana

=== Section Phyllaria ===
- Utricularia brachiata
- Utricularia christopheri
- Utricularia corynephora
- Utricularia forrestii
- Utricularia furcellata
- Utricularia garrettii
- Utricularia inthanonensis
- Utricularia kumaonensis
- Utricularia moniliformis
- Utricularia multicaulis
- Utricularia phusoidaoensis
- Utricularia pulchra
- Utricularia salwinensis
- Utricularia spinomarginata
- Utricularia steenisii
- Utricularia striatula

=== Section Stomoisia ===
- Utricularia cornuta
- Utricularia juncea
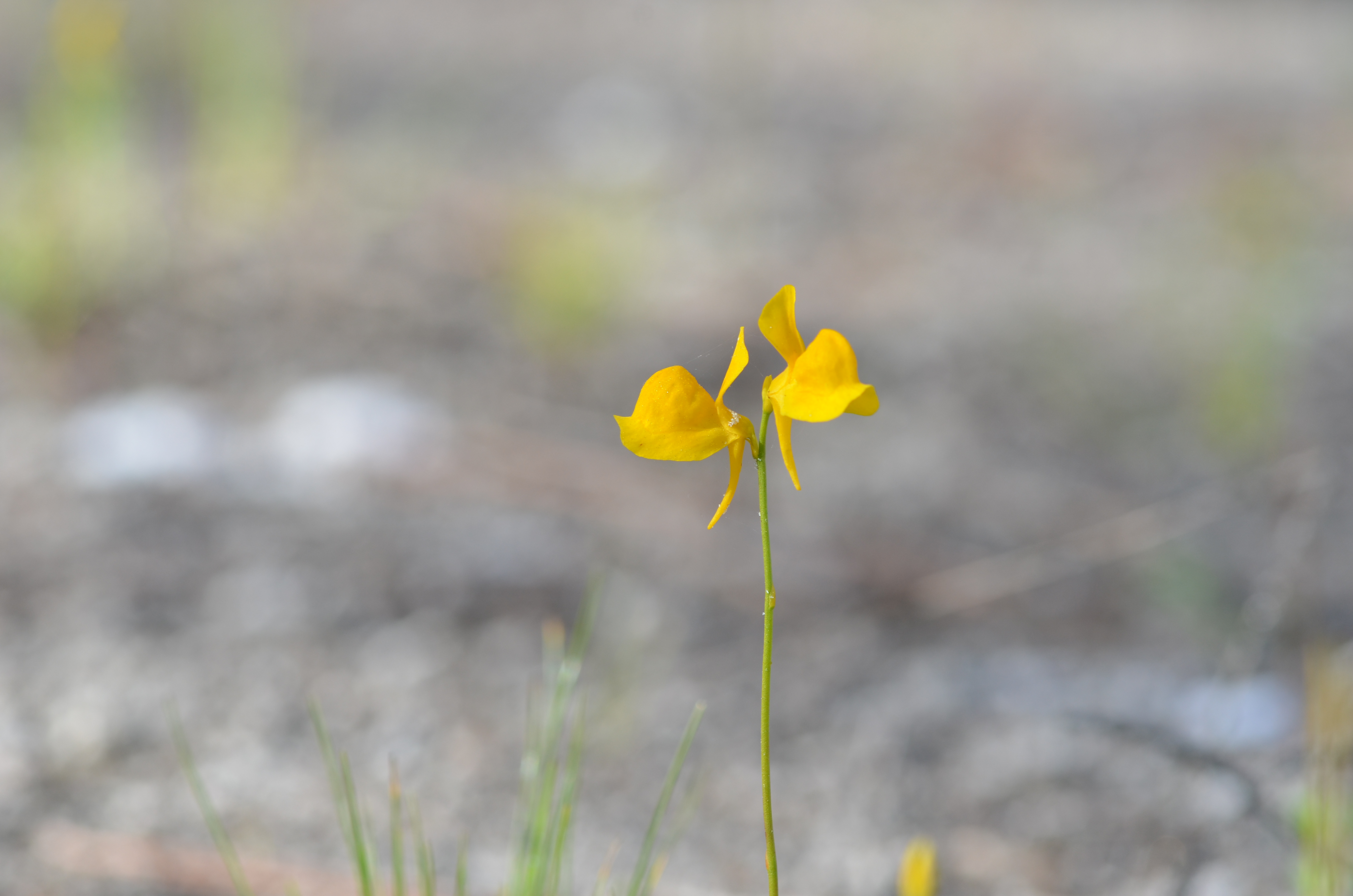
  Utricularia cornuta

== Subgenus Polypompholyx ==
=== Section Pleiochasia ===
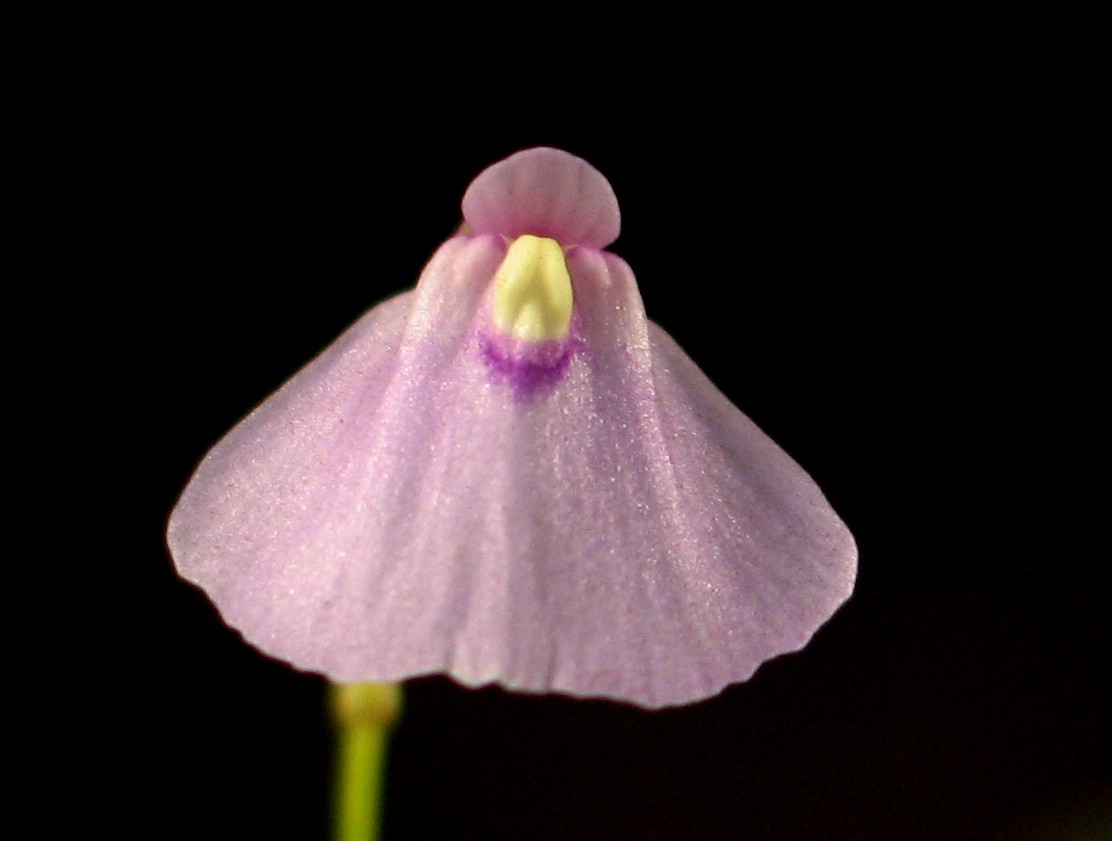
Utricularia dichotoma

- Utricularia albiflora
- Utricularia ameliae
- Utricularia barkeri
- Utricularia beaugleholei
- Utricularia benthamii
- Utricularia blackmanii
- Utricularia dichotoma
- Utricularia fenshamii
- Utricularia fistulosa
- Utricularia grampiana
- Utricularia hamiltonii
- Utricularia helix
- Utricularia inaequalis
- Utricularia menziesii
- Utricularia paulineae
- Utricularia petertaylorii
- Utricularia singeriana
- Utricularia terrae-reginae
- Utricularia triflora
- Utricularia tubulata
- Utricularia violacea
- Utricularia volubilis

=== Section Lasiocaules ===
- Utricularia albertiana
- Utricularia antennifera
- Utricularia arnhemica
- Utricularia bidentata
- Utricularia capilliflora
- Utricularia cheiranthos
- Utricularia dunlopii
- Utricularia dunstaniae
- Utricularia georgei
- Utricularia holtzei
- Utricularia kamienskii
- Utricularia kenneallyi
- Utricularia kimberleyensis
- Utricularia lasiocaulis
- Utricularia leptorhyncha
- Utricularia lowriei
- Utricularia magna
- Utricularia papilliscapa
- Utricularia quinquedentata
- Utricularia rhododactylos
- Utricularia tridactyla
- Utricularia uniflora
- Utricularia wannanii

=== Section Polypompholyx ===
- Utricularia multifida
- Utricularia tenella

=== Section Tridentaria ===
- Utricularia westonii

== Subgenus Utricularia ==
=== Section Avesicaria ===
- Utricularia neottioides
- Utricularia oliveriana

=== Section Candollea ===
- Utricularia podadena

=== Section Chelidon ===
- Utricularia mannii

=== Section Choristothecae ===
- Utricularia choristotheca
- Utricularia determannii

=== Section Foliosa ===
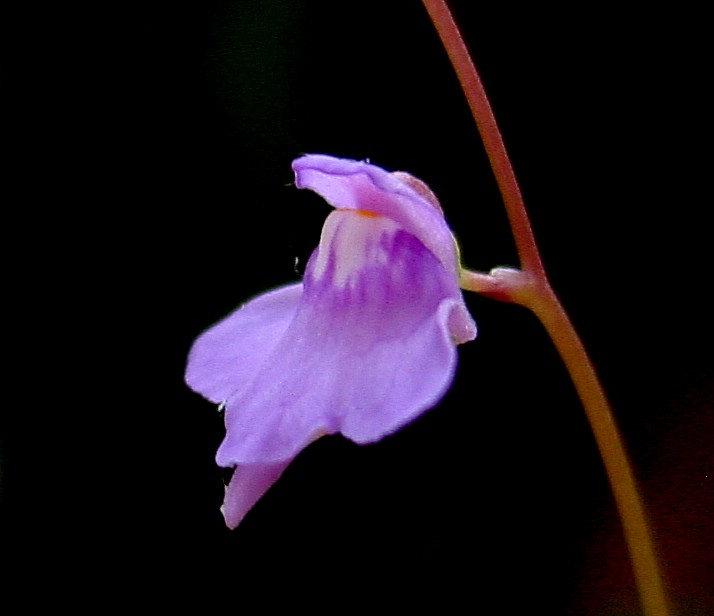
Utricularia amethystina

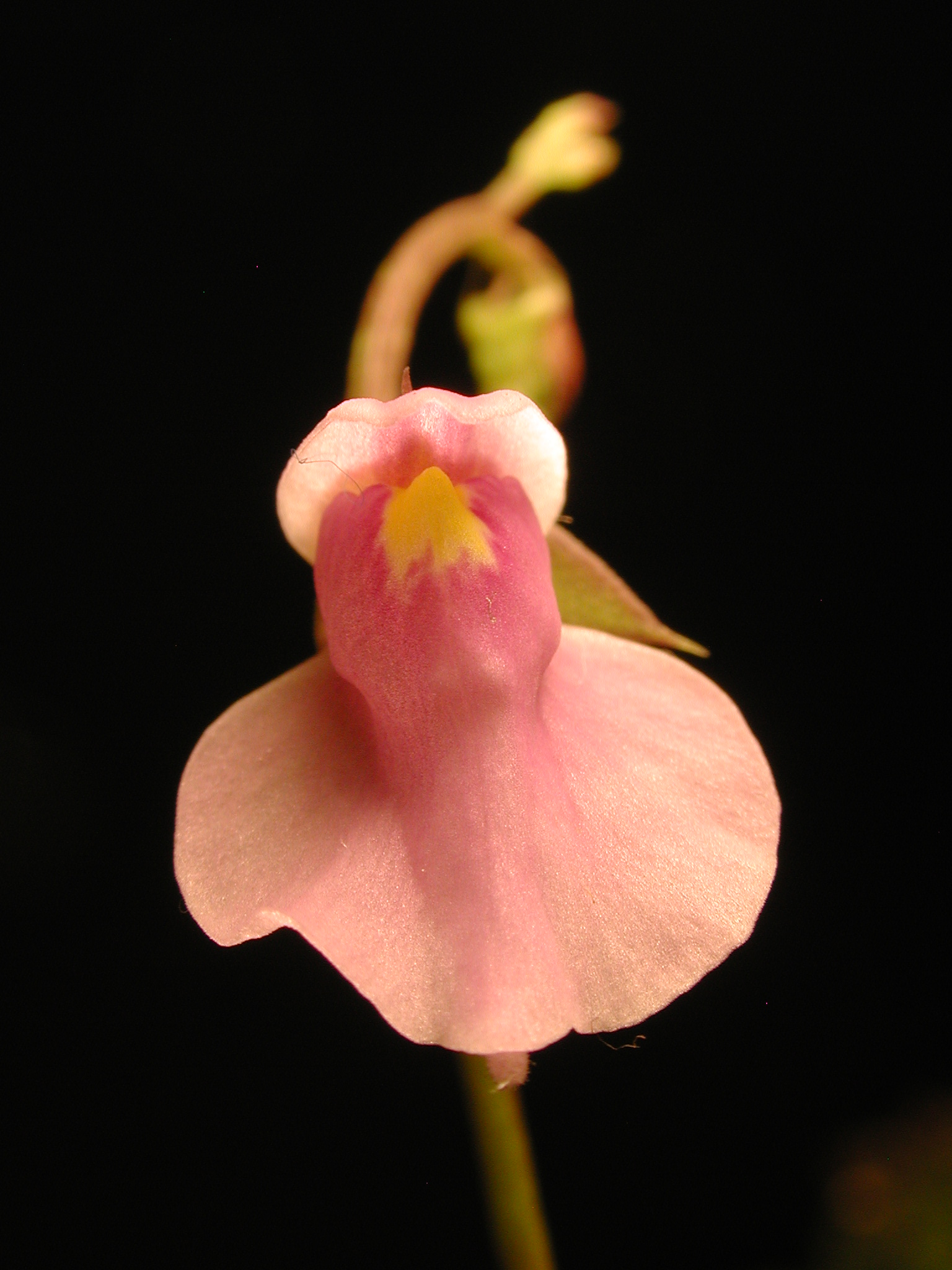
Utricularia calycifida

- Utricularia amethystina
- Utricularia calycifida
- Utricularia hintonii
- Utricularia hispida
- Utricularia huntii
- Utricularia longifolia
- Utricularia panamensis
- Utricularia petersoniae
- Utricularia praelonga
- Utricularia regia
- Utricularia schultesii
- Utricularia tricolor
- Utricularia tridentata

=== Section Kamienskia ===
- Utricularia mangshanensis
- Utricularia peranomala

=== Section Lecticula ===
- Utricularia resupinata
- Utricularia spruceana

=== Section Martinia ===
- Utricularia tenuissima

=== Section Meionula ===
- Utricularia geoffrayi
- Utricularia hirta
- Utricularia minutissima

=== Section Mirabiles ===
- Utricularia heterochroma
- Utricularia mirabilis

=== Section Nelipus ===
- Utricularia biloba
- Utricularia leptoplectra
- Utricularia limosa

=== Section Oliveria ===
- Utricularia appendiculata

=== Section Orchidioides ===
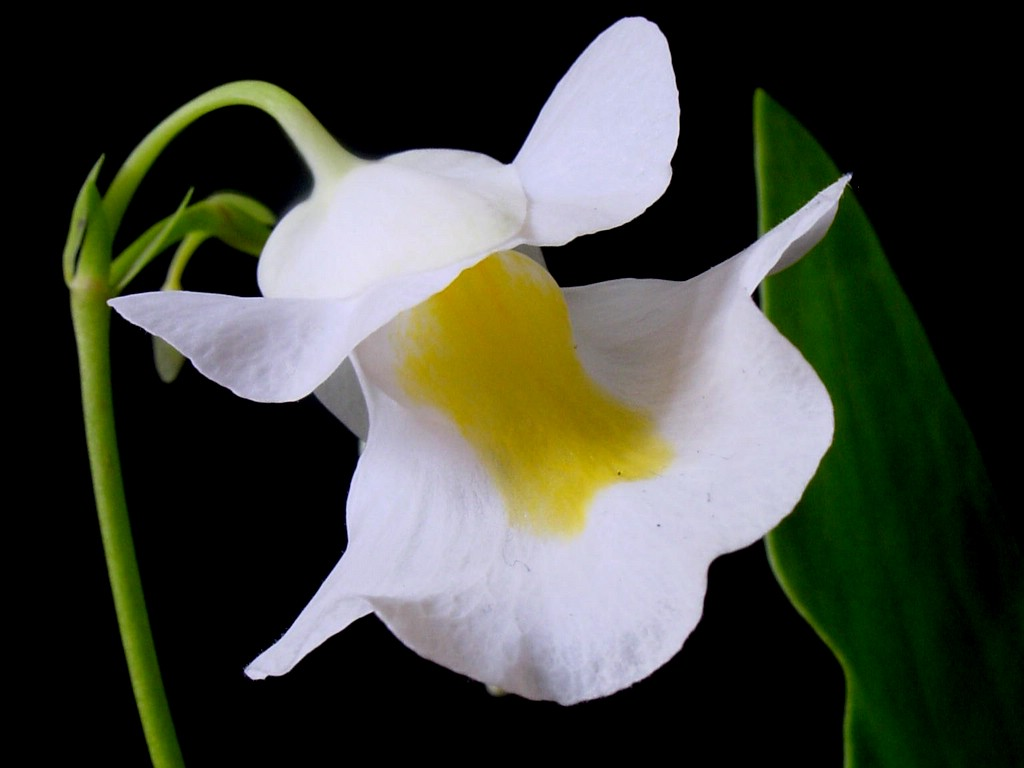
Utricularia alpina

- Utricularia alpina
- Utricularia asplundii
- Utricularia buntingiana
- Utricularia campbelliana
- Utricularia cornigera
- Utricularia endresii
- Utricularia geminiloba
- Utricularia humboldtii
- Utricularia jamesoniana

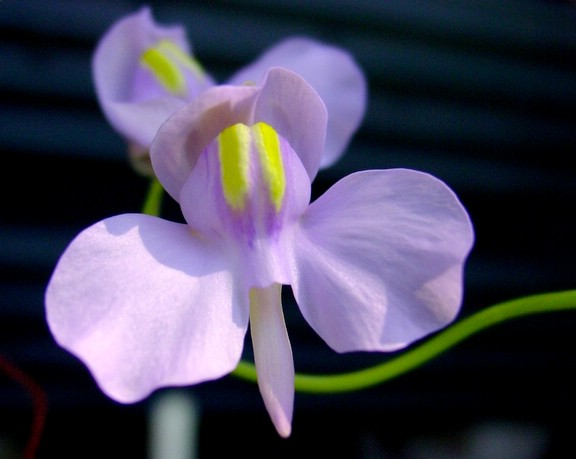
Utricularia nelumbifolia

- Utricularia nelumbifolia
- Utricularia nephrophylla
- Utricularia praetermissa
- Utricularia quelchii
- Utricularia reniformis
- Utricularia unifolia
- Utricularia uxoris

=== Section Setiscapella ===
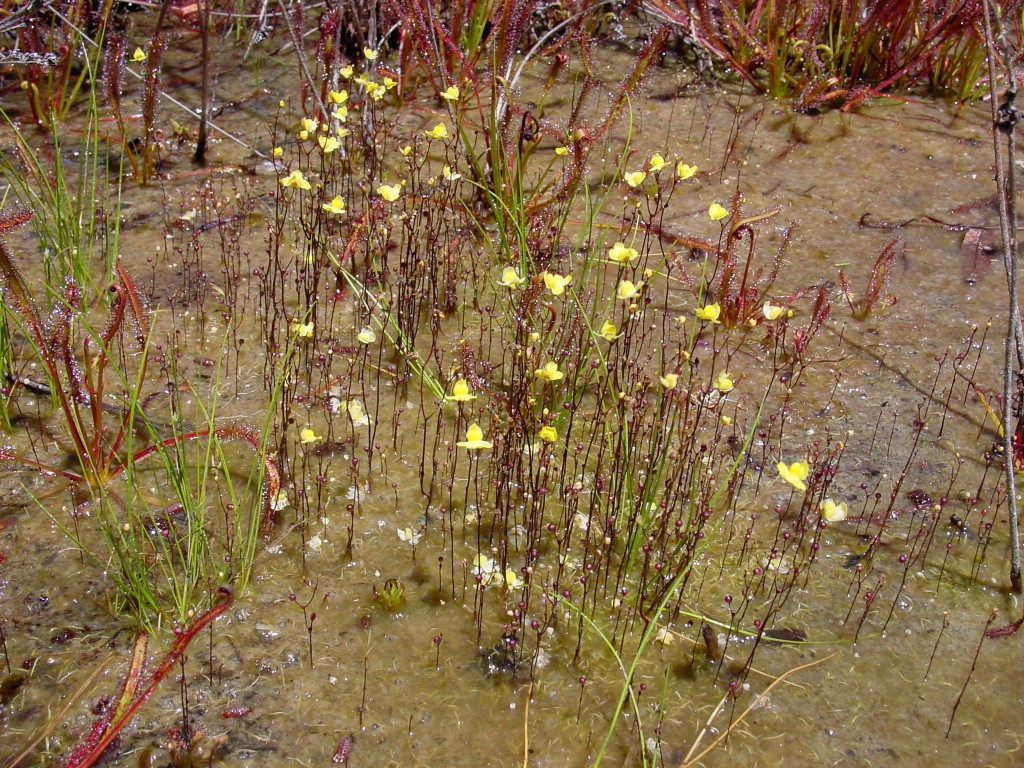
Utricularia subulata

- Utricularia flaccida
- Utricularia nervosa
- Utricularia nigrescens
- Utricularia physoceras
- Utricularia pusilla
- Utricularia stanfieldii
- Utricularia subulata
- Utricularia trichophylla
- Utricularia triloba

=== Section Sprucea ===
- Utricularia viscosa

=== Section Steyermarkia ===
- Utricularia aureomaculata
- Utricularia cochleata
- Utricularia steyermarkii

=== Section Stylotheca ===
- Utricularia guyanensis

=== Section Utricularia ===
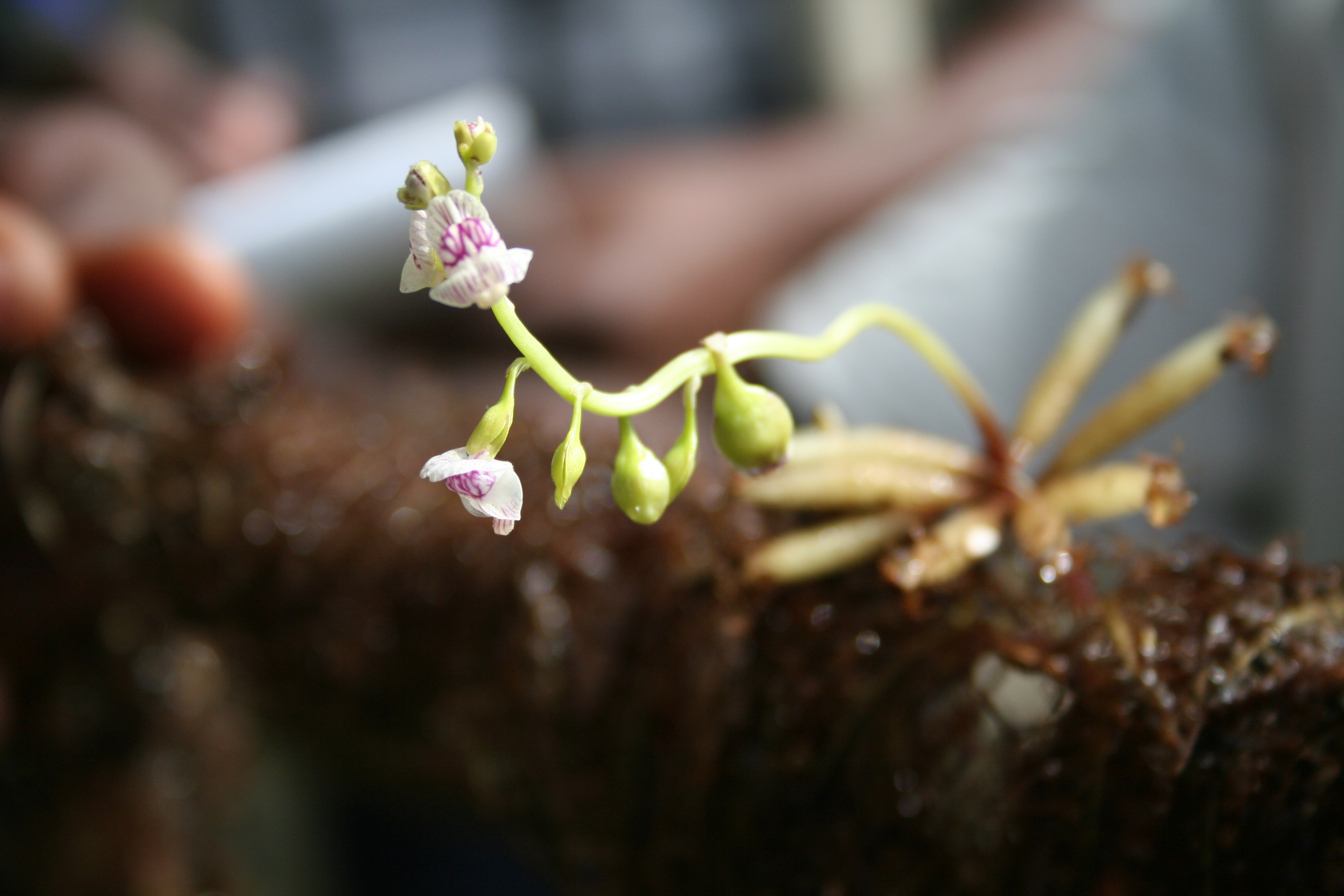
Utricularia inflexa

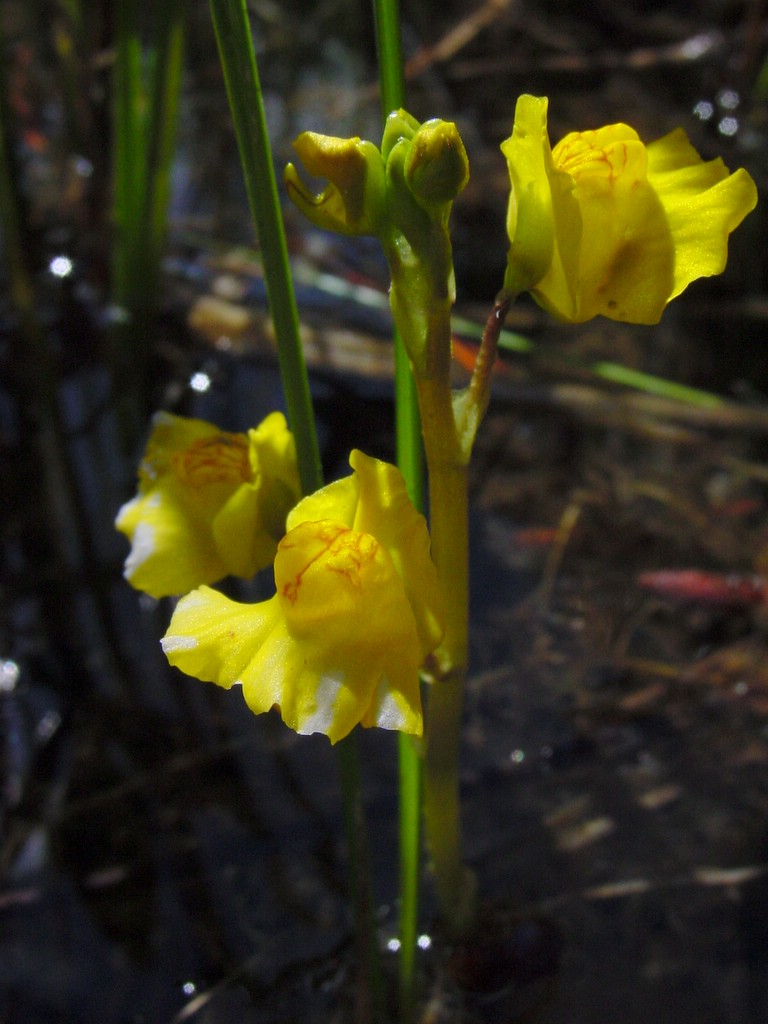
Utricularia macrorhiza

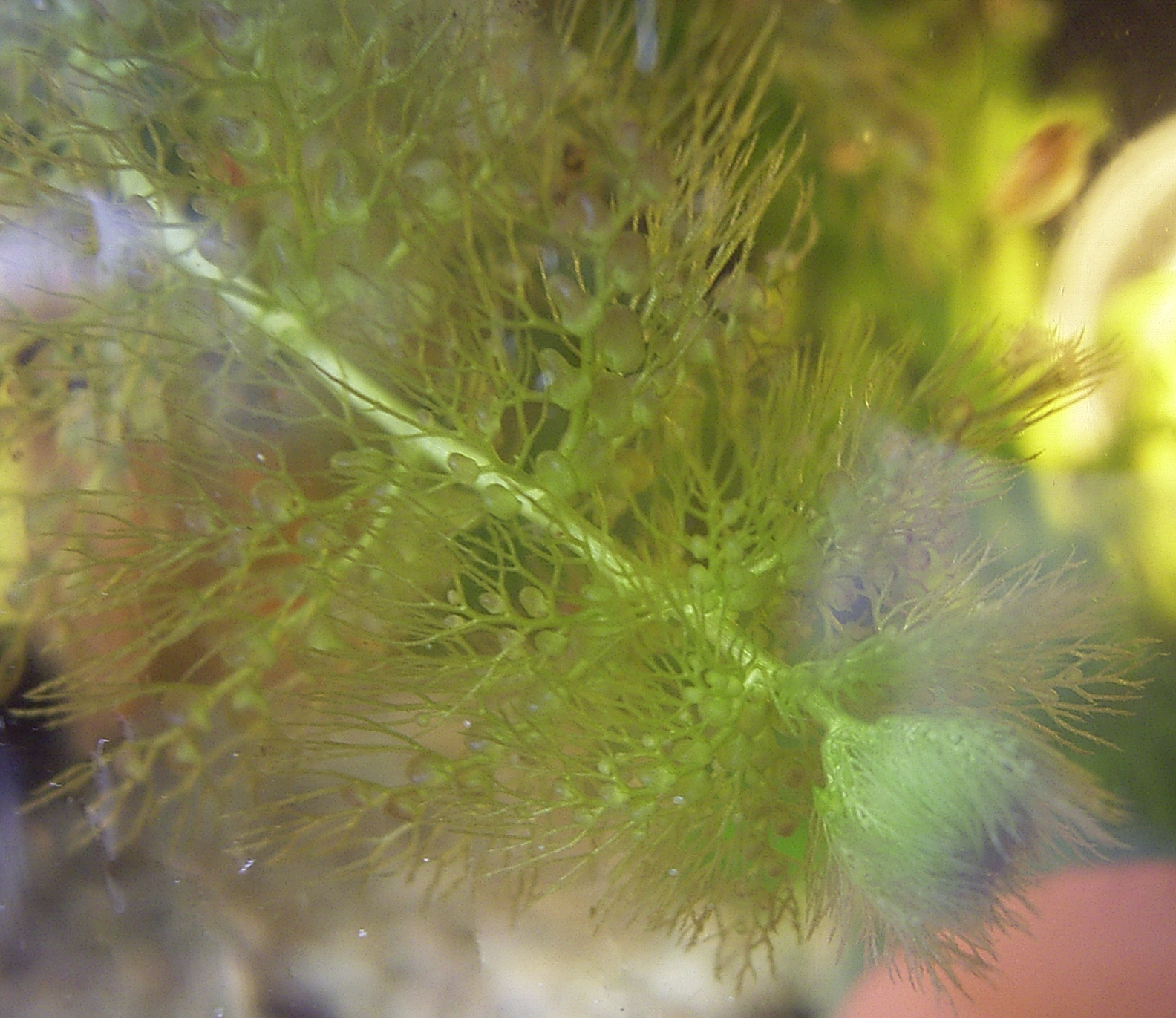
Utricularia vulgaris

- Utricularia aurea
- Utricularia australis
- Utricularia benjaminiana
- Utricularia biovularioides
- Utricularia bremii
- Utricularia breviscapa
- Utricularia chiakiana
- Utricularia corneliana
- Utricularia cymbantha
- Utricularia dimorphantha
- Utricularia floridana
- Utricularia foliosa
- Utricularia geminiscapa
- Utricularia gibba
- Utricularia hydrocarpa
- Utricularia incisa
- Utricularia inflata
- Utricularia inflexa
- Utricularia intermedia
- Utricularia macrorhiza
- Utricularia minor
- Utricularia muelleri
- Utricularia naviculata
- Utricularia ochroleuca
- Utricularia olivacea
- Utricularia perversa
- Utricularia platensis
- Utricularia poconensis
- Utricularia punctata
- Utricularia radiata
- Utricularia raynalii
- Utricularia reflexa
- Utricularia stellaris
- Utricularia striata
- Utricularia stygia
- Utricularia vulgaris
- Utricularia warmingii

=== Section Vesiculina ===
- Utricularia cucullata
- Utricularia myriocista
- Utricularia purpurea

== See also ==
- Utricularia capillacea
- Utricularia linearis
