= Utricularia blackmanii =

Scientific classification
- Kingdom: Plantae
- Clade: Tracheophytes
- Clade: Angiosperms
- Clade: Eudicots
- Clade: Asterids
- Order: Lamiales
- Family: Lentibulariaceae
- Genus: Utricularia
- Subgenus: Utricularia subg. Polypompholyx
- Section: Utricularia sect. Pleiochasia
- Species: U. blackmanii

Binomial name
- Utricularia blackmanii R.W.Jobson (2012)

Species of carnivorous plant

Utricularia blackmanii is a terrestrial carnivorous plant belonging to the genus Utricularia (family Lentibulariaceae). It is known only from northern Queensland, Australia, where it has been recorded from elevations of 200–900 m above sea level.

== See also ==
- List of Utricularia species
