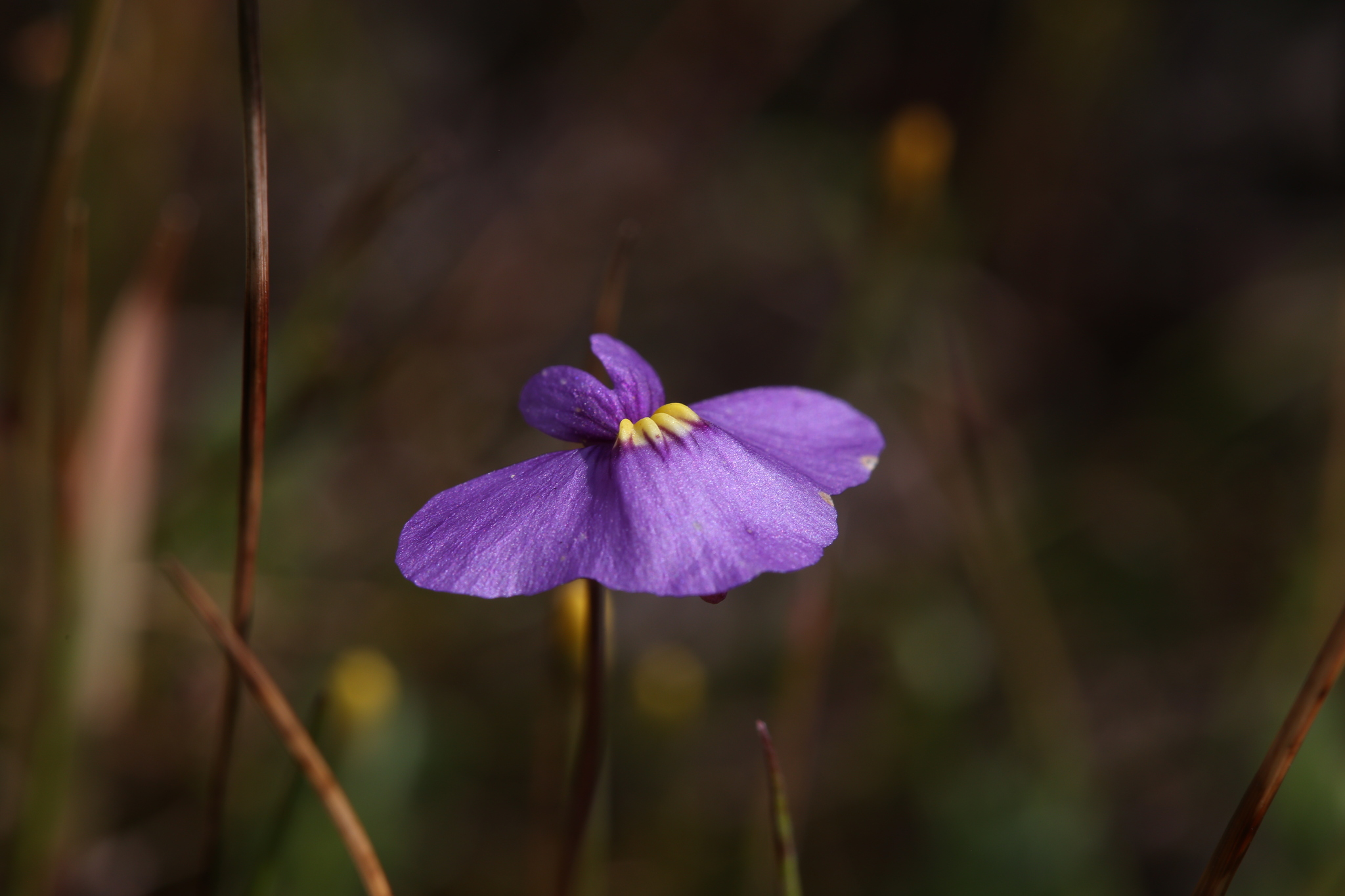

Scientific classification
- Kingdom: Plantae
- Clade: Tracheophytes
- Clade: Angiosperms
- Clade: Eudicots
- Clade: Asterids
- Order: Lamiales
- Family: Lentibulariaceae
- Genus: Utricularia
- Subgenus: Utricularia subg. Polypompholyx
- Section: Utricularia sect. Pleiochasia
- Species: U. inaequalis

Binomial name
- Utricularia inaequalis A.DC. 1844

Synonyms
- U. hookeri Lehm. 1844; U. latilabiata Benj. 1847; U. linearifolia Benj. 1847

= Utricularia inaequalis =

Species of carnivorous plant

Utricularia inaequalis is an annual terrestrial carnivorous plant in the family Lentibulariaceae. It is endemic to the southwestern coastal region of Western Australia.

== See also ==
- List of Utricularia species
