= Utricularia fistulosa =

Scientific classification
- Kingdom: Plantae
- Clade: Tracheophytes
- Clade: Angiosperms
- Clade: Eudicots
- Clade: Asterids
- Order: Lamiales
- Family: Lentibulariaceae
- Genus: Utricularia
- Subgenus: Utricularia subg. Polypompholyx
- Section: Utricularia sect. Pleiochasia
- Species: U. fistulosa

Binomial name
- Utricularia fistulosa P.Taylor 1986

Species of carnivorous plant

Utricularia fistulosa is an affixed aquatic carnivorous plant that belongs to the genus Utricularia (family Lentibulariaceae). It is a widespread species in the northeastern region of Western Australia.

== See also ==
- List of Utricularia species
