= Utricularia tenella =

Scientific classification
- Kingdom: Plantae
- Clade: Tracheophytes
- Clade: Angiosperms
- Clade: Eudicots
- Clade: Asterids
- Order: Lamiales
- Family: Lentibulariaceae
- Genus: Utricularia
- Subgenus: Utricularia subg. Polypompholyx
- Section: Utricularia sect. Polypompholyx
- Species: U. tenella

Binomial name
- Utricularia tenella R.Br. 1810

Species of plant

Utricularia tenella is a terrestrial carnivorous plant that belongs to the genus Utricularia (family Lentibulariaceae). Its distribution includes areas in Western Australia, South Australia, Victoria, and Tasmania.

== See also ==
- List of Utricularia species
