= Utricularia albiflora =

Scientific classification
- Kingdom: Plantae
- Clade: Tracheophytes
- Clade: Angiosperms
- Clade: Eudicots
- Clade: Asterids
- Order: Lamiales
- Family: Lentibulariaceae
- Genus: Utricularia
- Subgenus: Utricularia subg. Polypompholyx
- Section: Utricularia sect. Pleiochasia
- Species: U. albiflora

Binomial name
- Utricularia albiflora R.Br. 1810

Synonyms
- Vesiculina albiflora (R.Br.) Raf. 1838

Species of carnivorous plant

Utricularia albiflora is a terrestrial carnivorous plant that belongs to the genus Utricularia (family Lentibulariaceae). It is endemic to Queensland, Australia.

== See also ==
- List of Utricularia species
