= Utricularia hamiltonii =

Scientific classification
- Kingdom: Plantae
- Clade: Tracheophytes
- Clade: Angiosperms
- Clade: Eudicots
- Clade: Asterids
- Order: Lamiales
- Family: Lentibulariaceae
- Genus: Utricularia
- Subgenus: Utricularia subg. Polypompholyx
- Section: Utricularia sect. Pleiochasia
- Species: U. hamiltonii

Binomial name
- Utricularia hamiltonii F.Lloyd 1936

Species of carnivorous plant

Utricularia hamiltonii is an affixed aquatic carnivorous plant that belongs to the genus Utricularia (family Lentibulariaceae). It is endemic to the Northern Territory of Australia.

== See also ==
- List of Utricularia species
