= Utricularia kenneallyi =

Scientific classification
- Kingdom: Plantae
- Clade: Tracheophytes
- Clade: Angiosperms
- Clade: Eudicots
- Clade: Asterids
- Order: Lamiales
- Family: Lentibulariaceae
- Genus: Utricularia
- Subgenus: Utricularia subg. Polypompholyx
- Section: Utricularia sect. Pleiochasia
- Species: U. kenneallyi

Binomial name
- Utricularia kenneallyi P.Taylor 1986

Species of carnivorous plant

Utricularia kenneallyi is an annual terrestrial carnivorous plant that belongs to the genus Utricularia (family Lentibulariaceae). It is endemic to the Kimberley region of Western Australia.

== See also ==
- List of Utricularia species
