= Utricularia lasiocaulis =

Scientific classification
- Kingdom: Plantae
- Clade: Tracheophytes
- Clade: Angiosperms
- Clade: Eudicots
- Clade: Asterids
- Order: Lamiales
- Family: Lentibulariaceae
- Genus: Utricularia
- Subgenus: Utricularia subg. Polypompholyx
- Section: Utricularia sect. Pleiochasia
- Species: U. lasiocaulis

Binomial name
- Utricularia lasiocaulis F.Muell. 1885

Species of carnivorous plant

Utricularia lasiocaulis is an annual terrestrial carnivorous plant that belongs to the genus Utricularia (family Lentibulariaceae). Its distribution ranges from Western Australia through the Northern Territory and into Queensland, Australia.

The species was named by Victorian Government botanist Ferdinand von Mueller in 1885 and is characterised by large fanlike flowers in violet and yellow.

== See also ==
- List of Utricularia species
