= Utricularia linearis =

Scientific classification
- Kingdom: Plantae
- Clade: Tracheophytes
- Clade: Angiosperms
- Clade: Eudicots
- Clade: Asterids
- Order: Lamiales
- Family: Lentibulariaceae
- Genus: Utricularia
- Species: U. linearis

Binomial name
- Utricularia linearis Wakabayashi

Species of carnivorous plant

Utricularia linearis is a carnivorous plant belonging to the genus Utricularia. It is known only from a single unnamed lagoon in Howard Springs, Northern Territory, Australia.

== See also ==
- List of Utricularia species
