= Utricularia cheiranthos =

Scientific classification
- Kingdom: Plantae
- Clade: Tracheophytes
- Clade: Angiosperms
- Clade: Eudicots
- Clade: Asterids
- Order: Lamiales
- Family: Lentibulariaceae
- Genus: Utricularia
- Subgenus: Utricularia subg. Polypompholyx
- Section: Utricularia sect. Pleiochasia
- Species: U. cheiranthos

Binomial name
- Utricularia cheiranthos P.Taylor 1986

Species of carnivorous plant

Utricularia cheiranthos is a terrestrial carnivorous plant that belongs to the genus Utricularia (family Lentibulariaceae). It is endemic to the Northern Territory where it is only known from the type location near the Arnhem Land escarpment.

== See also ==
- List of Utricularia species
