= Utricularia helix =

Scientific classification
- Kingdom: Plantae
- Clade: Tracheophytes
- Clade: Angiosperms
- Clade: Eudicots
- Clade: Asterids
- Order: Lamiales
- Family: Lentibulariaceae
- Genus: Utricularia
- Subgenus: Utricularia subg. Polypompholyx
- Section: Utricularia sect. Pleiochasia
- Species: U. helix

Binomial name
- Utricularia helix P.Taylor 1986

Species of carnivorous plant

Utricularia helix is an annual affixed aquatic carnivorous plant that belongs to the genus Utricularia (family Lentibulariaceae). It is endemic to Western Australia.

== See also ==
- List of Utricularia species
