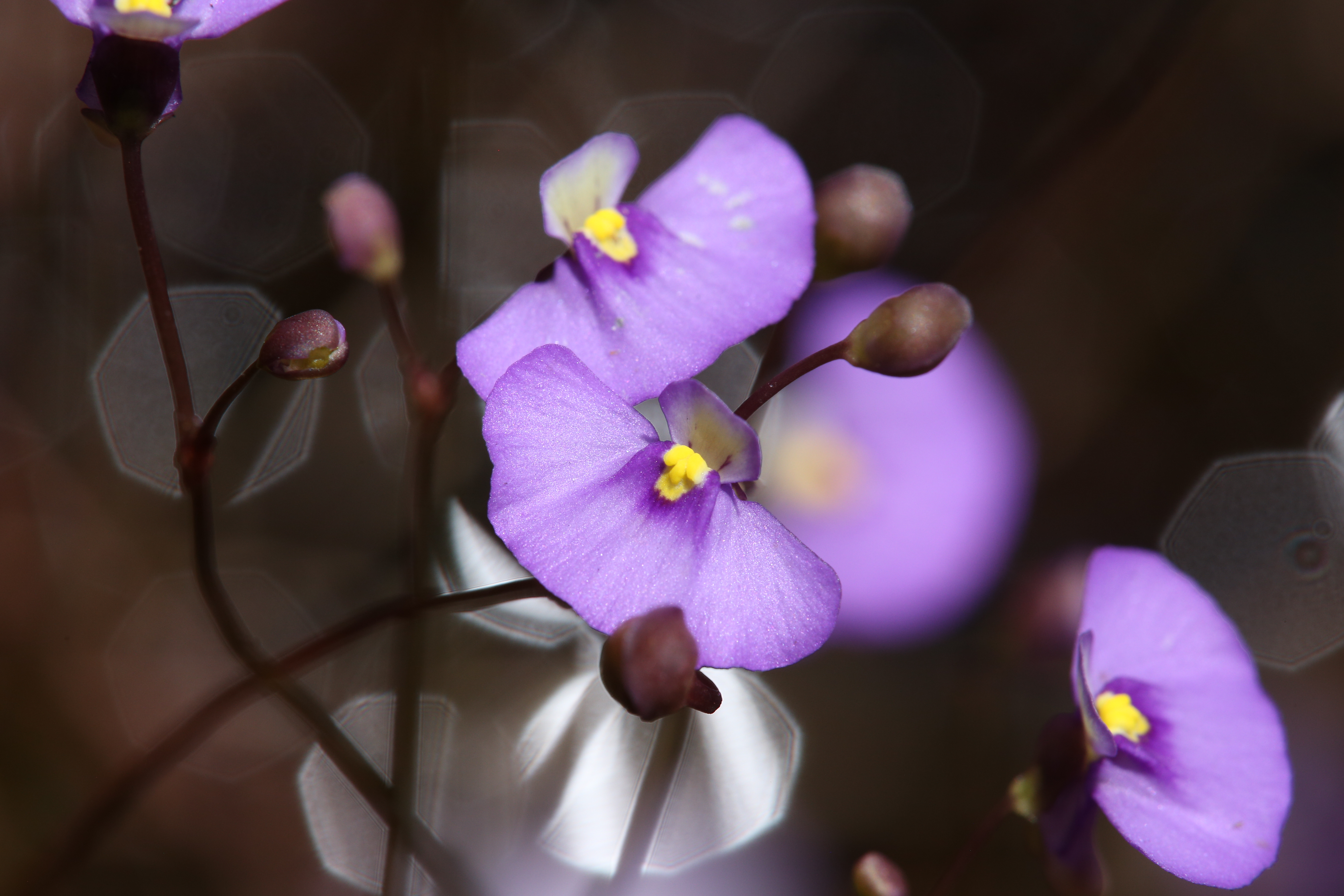
- Utricularia paulineae flowering near Walpole, Western Australia

Scientific classification
- Kingdom: Plantae
- Clade: Tracheophytes
- Clade: Angiosperms
- Clade: Eudicots
- Clade: Asterids
- Order: Lamiales
- Family: Lentibulariaceae
- Genus: Utricularia
- Subgenus: Utricularia subg. Polypompholyx
- Section: Utricularia sect. Pleiochasia
- Species: U. paulineae

Binomial name
- Utricularia paulineae Lowrie 1998

= Utricularia paulineae =

Species of carnivorous plant

Utricularia paulineae is an affixed aquatic carnivorous plant that belongs to the genus Utricularia (family Lentibulariaceae). It is endemic to the coastal regions of Western Australia.

== See also ==
- List of Utricularia species
