= Utricularia singeriana =

Scientific classification
- Kingdom: Plantae
- Clade: Tracheophytes
- Clade: Angiosperms
- Clade: Eudicots
- Clade: Asterids
- Order: Lamiales
- Family: Lentibulariaceae
- Genus: Utricularia
- Subgenus: Utricularia subg. Polypompholyx
- Section: Utricularia sect. Pleiochasia
- Species: U. singeriana

Binomial name
- Utricularia singeriana F.Muell. 1890

Synonyms
- U. pachyceras O.Schwarz 1927

Species of carnivorous plant

Utricularia pachyceras is a terrestrial carnivorous plant that belongs to the genus Utricularia (family Lentibulariaceae). It is endemic to Western Australia and the Northern Territory.

== See also ==
- List of Utricularia species
