= Utricularia kimberleyensis =

Scientific classification
- Kingdom: Plantae
- Clade: Tracheophytes
- Clade: Angiosperms
- Clade: Eudicots
- Clade: Asterids
- Order: Lamiales
- Family: Lentibulariaceae
- Genus: Utricularia
- Subgenus: Utricularia subg. Polypompholyx
- Section: Utricularia sect. Pleiochasia
- Species: U. kimberleyensis

Binomial name
- Utricularia kimberleyensis C.A.Gardner 1923

Species of carnivorous plant

Utricularia kimberleyensis, the Kimberley bladderwort, is a terrestrial carnivorous plant that belongs to the genus Utricularia (family Lentibulariaceae). Its distribution ranges from the Dampier Peninsula in northern Western Australia to the area around Darwin in the Northern Territory.

== See also ==
- List of Utricularia species
