= Utricularia tridactyla =

Scientific classification
- Kingdom: Plantae
- Clade: Tracheophytes
- Clade: Angiosperms
- Clade: Eudicots
- Clade: Asterids
- Order: Lamiales
- Family: Lentibulariaceae
- Genus: Utricularia
- Subgenus: Utricularia subg. Polypompholyx
- Section: Utricularia sect. Pleiochasia
- Species: U. tridactyla

Binomial name
- Utricularia tridactyla P.Taylor 1986

Species of carnivorous plant

Utricularia tridactyla is an annual, terrestrial carnivorous plant that belongs to the genus Utricularia (family Lentibulariaceae). It is endemic to northeastern Kimberley region in Western Australia.

== See also ==
- List of Utricularia species
