= Utricularia leptorhyncha =

Scientific classification
- Kingdom: Plantae
- Clade: Tracheophytes
- Clade: Angiosperms
- Clade: Eudicots
- Clade: Asterids
- Order: Lamiales
- Family: Lentibulariaceae
- Genus: Utricularia
- Subgenus: Utricularia subg. Polypompholyx
- Section: Utricularia sect. Pleiochasia
- Species: U. leptorhyncha

Binomial name
- Utricularia leptorhyncha O.Schwarz 1927

Species of carnivorous plant

Utricularia leptorhyncha is an annual, terrestrial carnivorous plant that belongs to the genus Utricularia (family Lentibulariaceae). Its distribution ranges from Western Australia to the Northern Territory.

== See also ==
- List of Utricularia species
