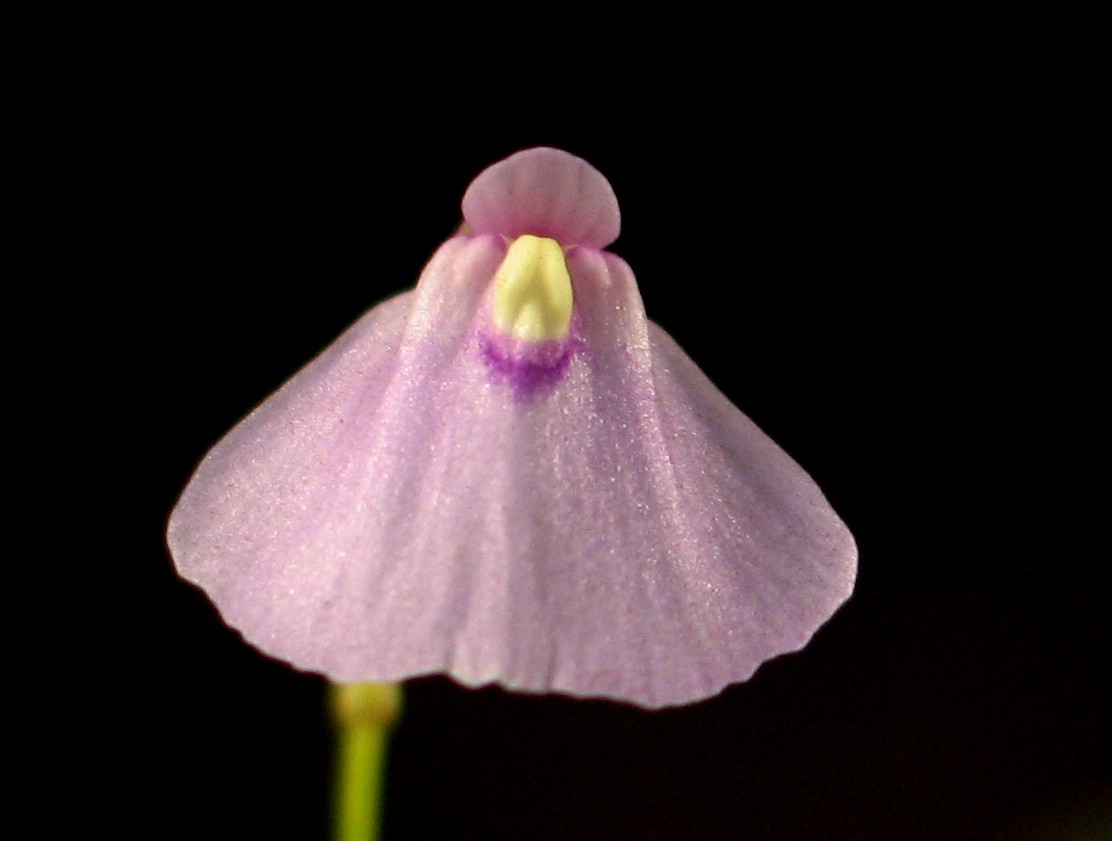
- Utricularia dichotoma

Scientific classification
- Kingdom: Plantae
- Clade: Embryophytes
- Clade: Tracheophytes
- Clade: Spermatophytes
- Clade: Angiosperms
- Clade: Eudicots
- Clade: Asterids
- Order: Lamiales
- Family: Lentibulariaceae
- Genus: Utricularia
- Subgenus: Utricularia subg. Polypompholyx
- Section: Utricularia sect. Pleiochasia; Kamiénski 1891

Species
- Utricularia albiflora Utricularia ameliae Utricularia antennifera Utricularia arnhemica Utricularia barkeri Utricularia beaugleholei Utricularia benthamii Utricularia blackmanii Utricularia capilliflora Utricularia cheiranthos Utricularia dichotoma Utricularia disjuncta Utricularia dunlopii Utricularia dunstaniae Utricularia fenshamii Utricularia fistulosa Utricularia georgei Utricularia grampiana Utricularia hamiltonii Utricularia helix Utricularia holtzei Utricularia inaequalis Utricularia kamienskii Utricularia kenneallyi Utricularia kimberleyensis Utricularia lasiocaulis Utricularia leptorhyncha Utricularia lowriei Utricularia menziesii Utricularia paulineae Utricularia petertaylorii Utricularia quinquedentata Utricularia rhododactylos Utricularia singeriana Utricularia terrae-reginae Utricularia tridactyla Utricularia triflora Utricularia tubulata Utricularia uniflora Utricularia violacea Utricularia volubilis

= Utricularia sect. Pleiochasia =

Group of carnivorous plants

Utricularia sect. Pleiochasia is a section in the genus Utricularia.

== See also ==
- List of Utricularia species
