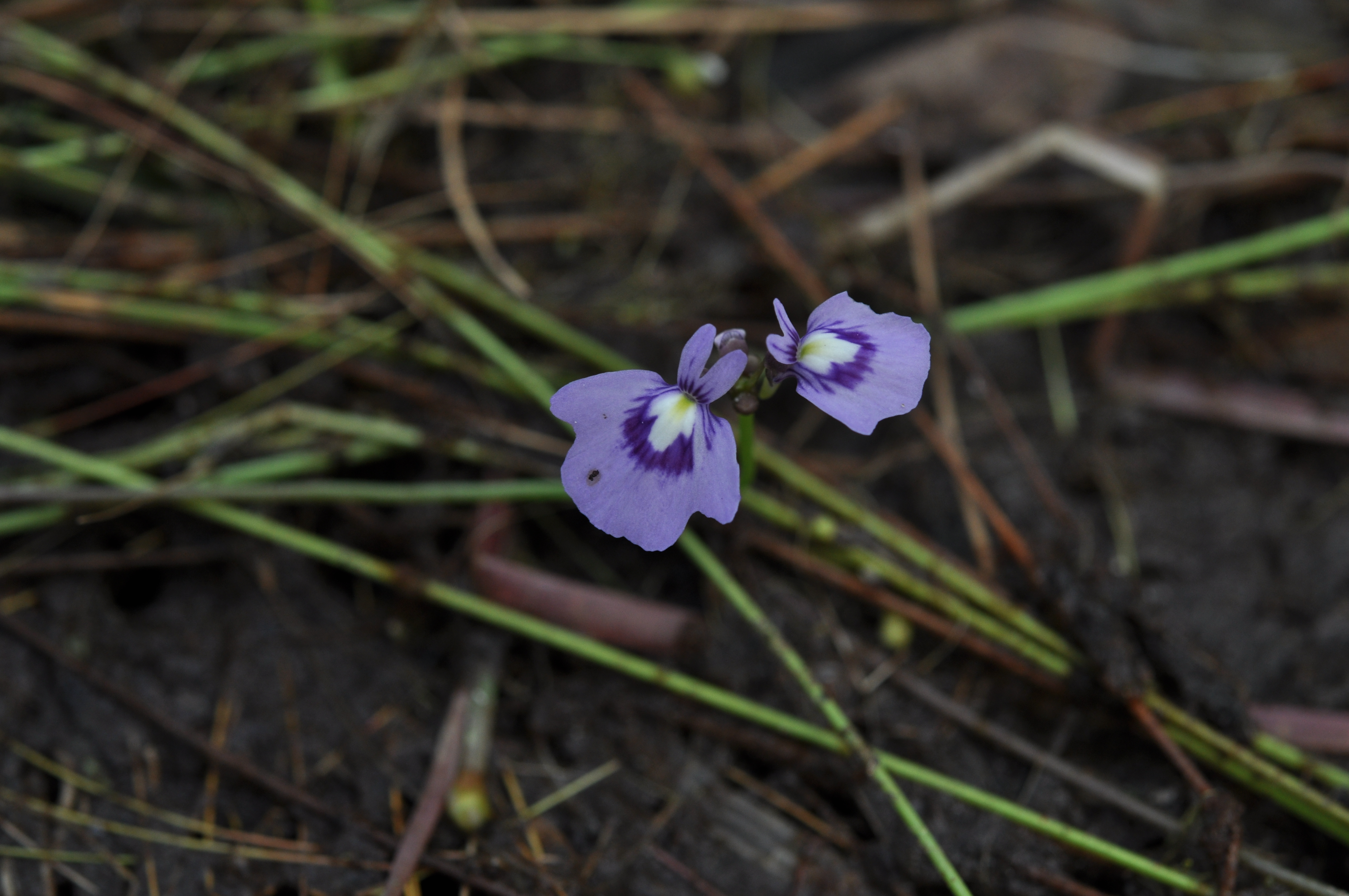

Scientific classification
- Kingdom: Plantae
- Clade: Tracheophytes
- Clade: Angiosperms
- Clade: Eudicots
- Clade: Asterids
- Order: Lamiales
- Family: Lentibulariaceae
- Genus: Utricularia
- Subgenus: Utricularia subg. Polypompholyx
- Section: Utricularia sect. Pleiochasia
- Species: U. triflora

Binomial name
- Utricularia triflora P.Taylor 1986

= Utricularia triflora =

Species of carnivorous plant

Utricularia triflora is an annual, terrestrial carnivorous plant that belongs to the genus Utricularia (family Lentibulariaceae). It is endemic to an area southeast of Darwin in the Northern Territory.

== See also ==
- List of Utricularia species
