= Utricularia dunstaniae =

Scientific classification
- Kingdom: Plantae
- Clade: Tracheophytes
- Clade: Angiosperms
- Clade: Eudicots
- Clade: Asterids
- Order: Lamiales
- Family: Lentibulariaceae
- Genus: Utricularia
- Subgenus: Utricularia subg. Polypompholyx
- Section: Utricularia sect. Pleiochasia
- Species: U. dunstaniae

Binomial name
- Utricularia dunstaniae F.Lloyd 1936

Species of carnivorous plant

Utricularia dunstaniae is an annual terrestrial carnivorous plant that belongs to the genus Utricularia (family Lentibulariaceae). Its distribution ranges from northern Western Australia to the Northern Territory.

== See also ==
- List of Utricularia species
