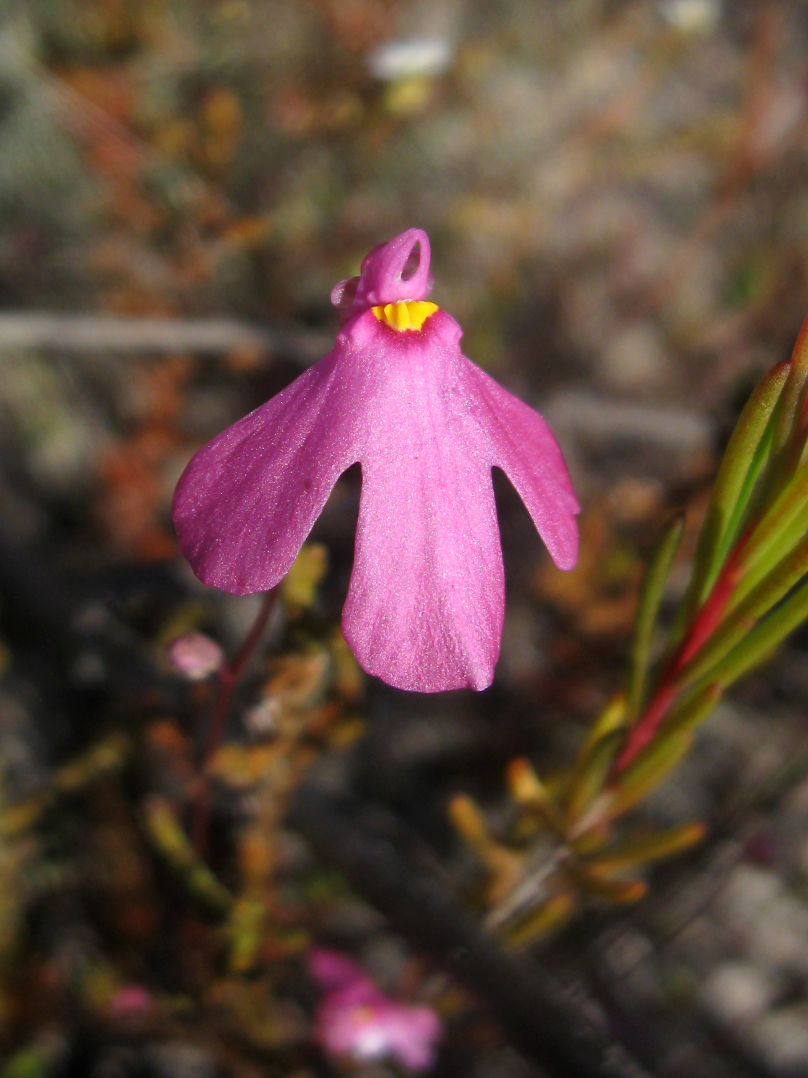

Scientific classification
- Kingdom: Plantae
- Clade: Tracheophytes
- Clade: Angiosperms
- Clade: Eudicots
- Clade: Asterids
- Order: Lamiales
- Family: Lentibulariaceae
- Genus: Utricularia
- Subgenus: Utricularia subg. Polypompholyx
- Section: Utricularia sect. Polypompholyx
- Species: U. multifida

Binomial name
- Utricularia multifida R.Br.

Synonyms
- Polypompholyx multifida (R.Br.) F.Muell.

= Utricularia multifida =

Species of carnivorous plant

Utricularia multifida, commonly called pink petticoat or fairy aprons, is a terrestrial carnivorous plant that belongs to the bladderwort genus Utricularia in family Lentibulariaceae. It is endemic to the south west corner of Western Australia. It was once placed in a separate genus as Polypompholyx multifida. An unusual character of U. multifida is that a tiny plant only 12 mm (0.47 in) wide producs a peduncle 10–12 cm (3.9–4.7 in) tall bearing 2 or 3 flowers each twice the size of the plant which produced them. There are insect traps on underground rhizomes which catch collembola and mites and other soil fauna.

== See also ==
- List of Utricularia species
