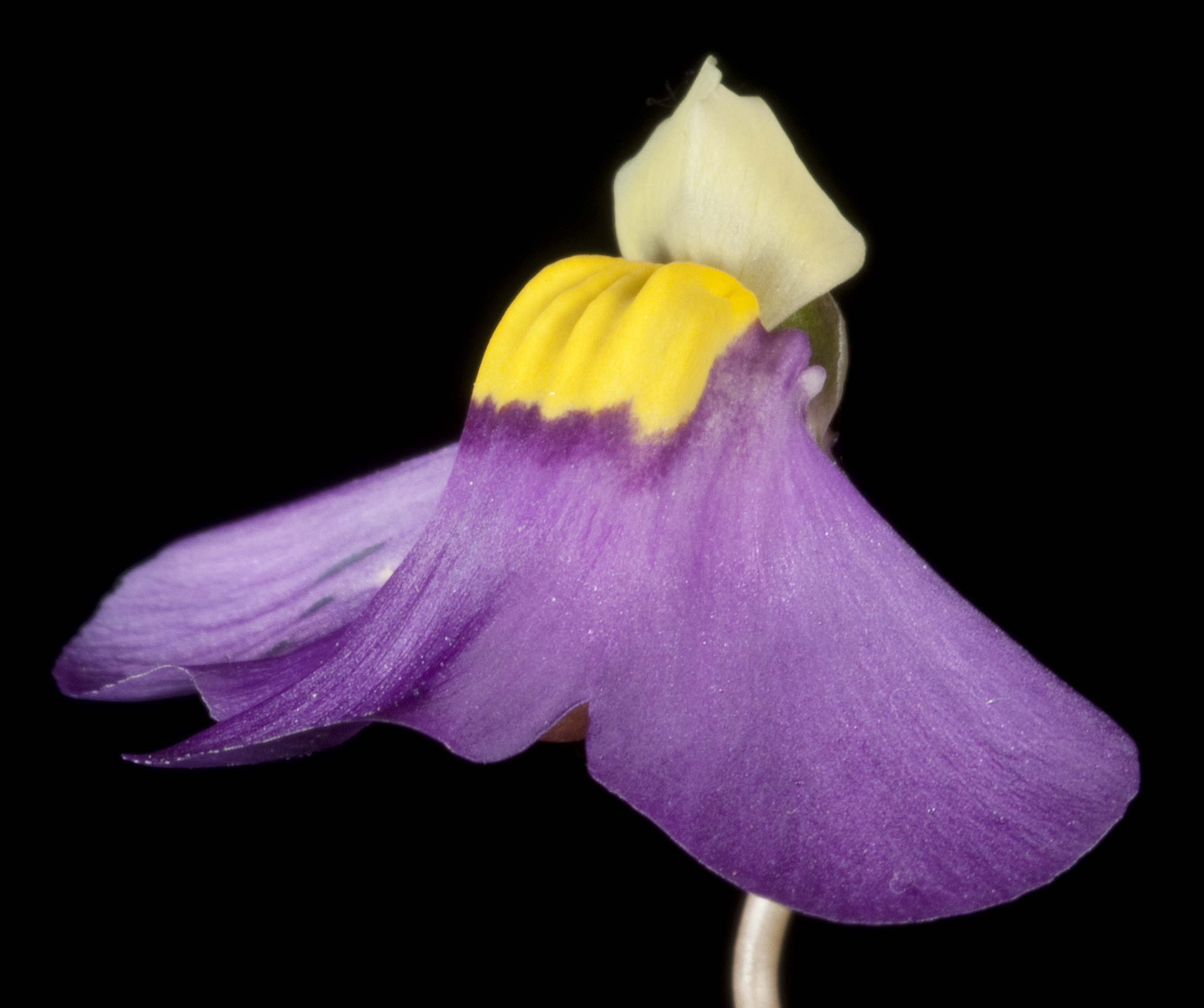

Scientific classification
- Kingdom: Plantae
- Clade: Tracheophytes
- Clade: Angiosperms
- Clade: Eudicots
- Clade: Asterids
- Order: Lamiales
- Family: Lentibulariaceae
- Genus: Utricularia
- Subgenus: Utricularia subg. Polypompholyx
- Section: Utricularia sect. Pleiochasia
- Species: U. benthamii

Binomial name
- Utricularia benthamii P.Taylor 1986

= Utricularia benthamii =

Species of carnivorous plant

Utricularia benthamii is a terrestrial carnivorous plant that belongs to the genus Utricularia (family Lentibulariaceae). It is endemic to Western Australia and is found southwest of Lake Muir, Manjimup, and Bridgetown.

== See also ==
- List of Utricularia species
