= Utricularia georgei =

Scientific classification
- Kingdom: Plantae
- Clade: Tracheophytes
- Clade: Angiosperms
- Clade: Eudicots
- Clade: Asterids
- Order: Lamiales
- Family: Lentibulariaceae
- Genus: Utricularia
- Subgenus: Utricularia subg. Polypompholyx
- Section: Utricularia sect. Pleiochasia
- Species: U. georgei

Binomial name
- Utricularia georgei P.Taylor 1986

Species of carnivorous plant

Utricularia georgei is an annual terrestrial carnivorous plant that belongs to the genus Utricularia (family Lentibulariaceae). It is endemic to northern Western Australia.

== See also ==
- List of Utricularia species
