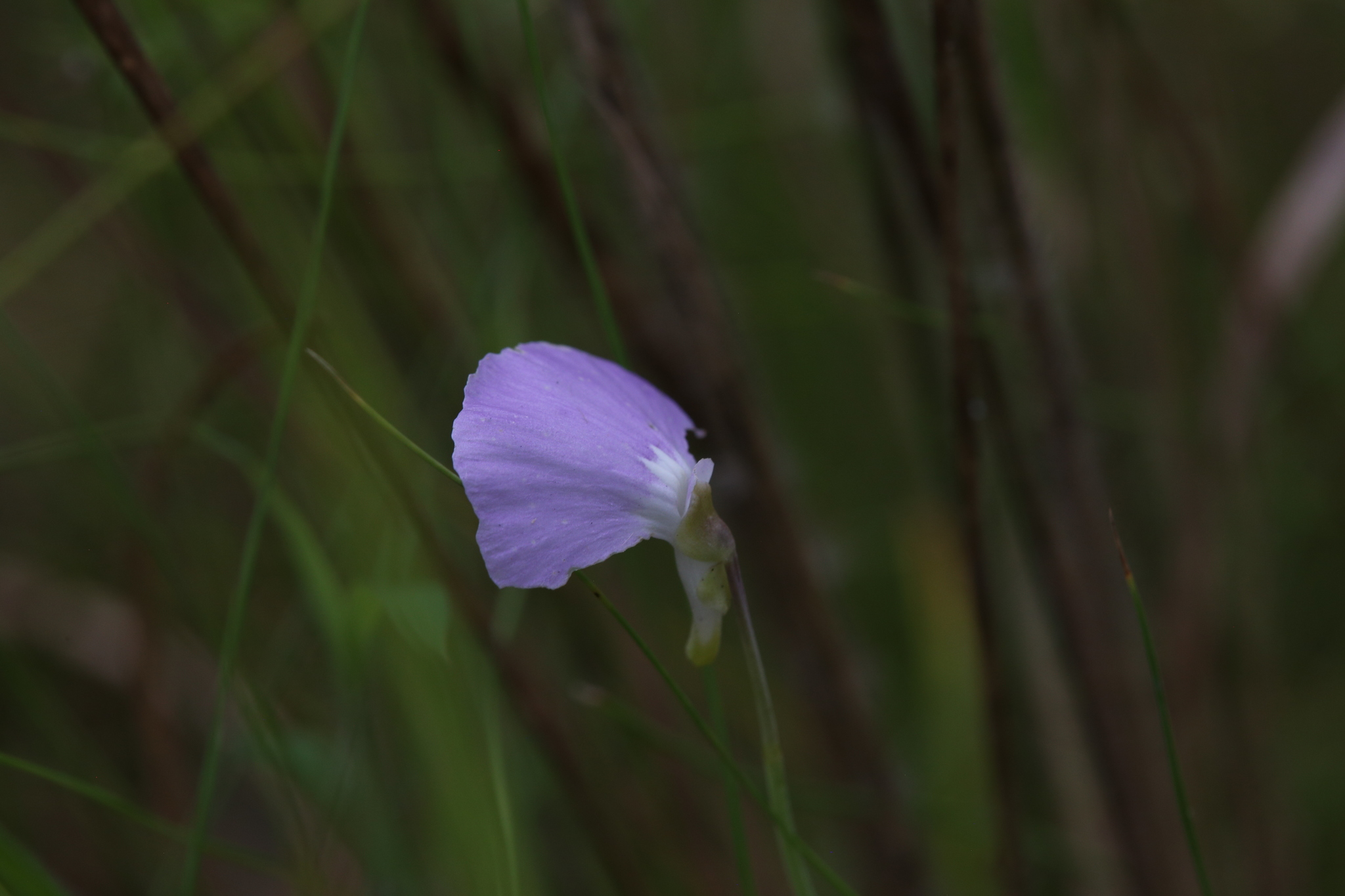

Scientific classification
- Kingdom: Plantae
- Clade: Tracheophytes
- Clade: Angiosperms
- Clade: Eudicots
- Clade: Asterids
- Order: Lamiales
- Family: Lentibulariaceae
- Genus: Utricularia
- Subgenus: Utricularia subg. Polypompholyx
- Section: Utricularia sect. Pleiochasia
- Species: U. terrae-reginae

Binomial name
- Utricularia terrae-reginae P.Taylor

= Utricularia terrae-reginae =

Species of carnivorous plant

Utricularia terrae-reginae is a small, probably annual carnivorous plant that belongs to the genus Utricularia. U. terrae-reginae is endemic to the Cape York Peninsula of Queensland, Australia, where it is only known from two locations. It grows as a terrestrial plant in sedge flats in shallow water or in open Melaleuca woodland at lower altitudes. It was originally described and published by Peter Taylor in 1986.

== See also ==
- List of Utricularia species
