= Utricularia kamienskii =

Scientific classification
- Kingdom: Plantae
- Clade: Tracheophytes
- Clade: Angiosperms
- Clade: Eudicots
- Clade: Asterids
- Order: Lamiales
- Family: Lentibulariaceae
- Genus: Utricularia
- Subgenus: Utricularia subg. Polypompholyx
- Section: Utricularia sect. Pleiochasia
- Species: U. kamienskii

Binomial name
- Utricularia kamienskii F.Muell. 1893

Species of carnivorous plant

Utricularia kamienskii is an annual terrestrial carnivorous plant that belongs to the genus Utricularia (family Lentibulariaceae). It is endemic to a few locations around Darwin in the Northern Territory.

== See also ==
- List of Utricularia species
