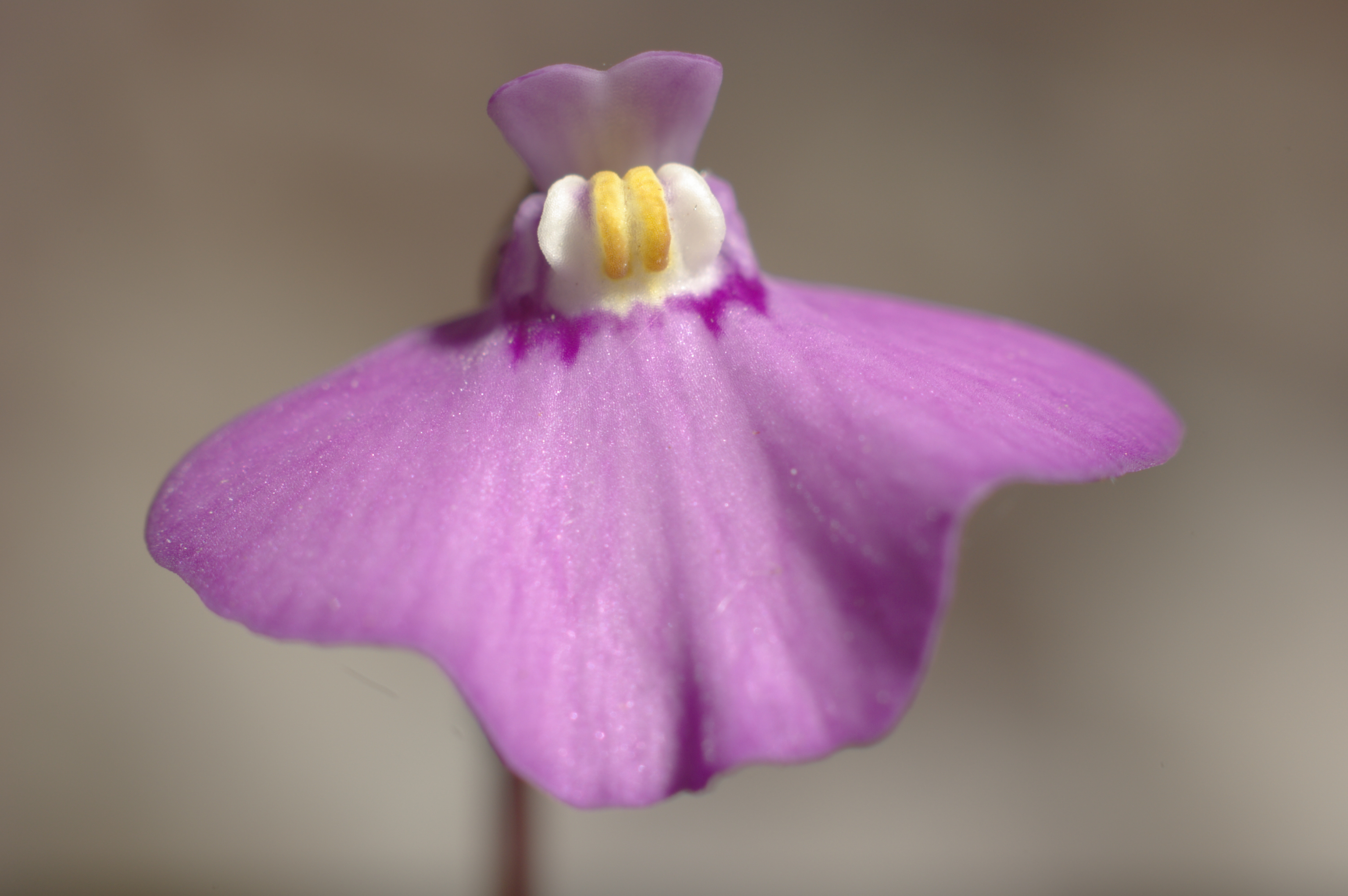

Scientific classification
- Kingdom: Plantae
- Clade: Tracheophytes
- Clade: Angiosperms
- Clade: Eudicots
- Clade: Asterids
- Order: Lamiales
- Family: Lentibulariaceae
- Genus: Utricularia
- Subgenus: Utricularia subg. Polypompholyx
- Section: Utricularia sect. Pleiochasia
- Species: U. uniflora

Binomial name
- Utricularia uniflora R.Br. 1810

Synonyms
- U. dichotoma var. uniflora (R.Br.) Benth. 1868

= Utricularia uniflora =

Species of carnivorous plant

Utricularia uniflora is a terrestrial carnivorous plant that belongs to the genus Utricularia (family Lentibulariaceae). Its distribution ranges across southeastern Australia from extreme southeastern Victoria through New South Wales to southern Queensland. It is also found in Tasmania.

== See also ==
- List of Utricularia species
