= Utricularia arnhemica =

Scientific classification
- Kingdom: Plantae
- Clade: Tracheophytes
- Clade: Angiosperms
- Clade: Eudicots
- Clade: Asterids
- Order: Lamiales
- Family: Lentibulariaceae
- Genus: Utricularia
- Subgenus: Utricularia subg. Polypompholyx
- Section: Utricularia sect. Pleiochasia
- Species: U. arnhemica

Binomial name
- Utricularia arnhemica P.Taylor 1986

Species of carnivorous plant

Utricularia arnhemica is an affixed aquatic or terrestrial carnivorous plant that belongs to the genus Utricularia (family Lentibulariaceae). It is endemic to the Arnhem Land area in the Northern Territory of Australia.

== See also ==
- List of Utricularia species
