= Utricularia capilliflora =

Scientific classification
- Kingdom: Plantae
- Clade: Tracheophytes
- Clade: Angiosperms
- Clade: Eudicots
- Clade: Asterids
- Order: Lamiales
- Family: Lentibulariaceae
- Genus: Utricularia
- Subgenus: Utricularia subg. Polypompholyx
- Section: Utricularia sect. Pleiochasia
- Species: U. capilliflora

Binomial name
- Utricularia capilliflora F.Muell. 1891

Species of carnivorous plant

Utricularia capilliflora is an annual terrestrial carnivorous plant that belongs to the genus Utricularia (family Lentibulariaceae). It is endemic to the Northern Territory where it is a rather widespread species in the vicinity of Darwin.

== See also ==
- List of Utricularia species
