= Utricularia dunlopii =

Scientific classification
- Kingdom: Plantae
- Clade: Tracheophytes
- Clade: Angiosperms
- Clade: Eudicots
- Clade: Asterids
- Order: Lamiales
- Family: Lentibulariaceae
- Genus: Utricularia
- Subgenus: Utricularia subg. Polypompholyx
- Section: Utricularia sect. Pleiochasia
- Species: U. dunlopii

Binomial name
- Utricularia dunlopii P.Taylor 1986

Species of carnivorous plant

Utricularia dunlopii is an annual terrestrial carnivorous plant that belongs to the genus Utricularia (family Lentibulariaceae). Its distribution ranges from Western Australia to the Northern Territory.

== See also ==
- List of Utricularia species
