= Utricularia tubulata =

Scientific classification
- Kingdom: Plantae
- Clade: Tracheophytes
- Clade: Angiosperms
- Clade: Eudicots
- Clade: Asterids
- Order: Lamiales
- Family: Lentibulariaceae
- Genus: Utricularia
- Subgenus: Utricularia subg. Polypompholyx
- Section: Utricularia sect. Pleiochasia
- Species: U. tubulata

Binomial name
- Utricularia tubulata F.Muell. 1875

Species of carnivorous plant

Utricularia tubulata is a suspended aquatic carnivorous plant that belongs to the genus Utricularia (family Lentibulariaceae). Its distribution ranges across northern Australia from Western Australia through the Northern Territory and into Queensland.

== See also ==
- List of Utricularia species
