= Utricularia rhododactylos =

Scientific classification
- Kingdom: Plantae
- Clade: Tracheophytes
- Clade: Angiosperms
- Clade: Eudicots
- Clade: Asterids
- Order: Lamiales
- Family: Lentibulariaceae
- Genus: Utricularia
- Subgenus: Utricularia subg. Polypompholyx
- Section: Utricularia sect. Pleiochasia
- Species: U. rhododactylos

Binomial name
- Utricularia rhododactylos P.Taylor 1986

Species of carnivorous plant

Utricularia rhododactylos is an annual carnivorous plant that belongs to the genus Utricularia (family Lentibulariaceae). It is a terrestrial or affixed subaquatic species. It is endemic to the Northern Territory in Australia.

== See also ==
- List of Utricularia species
