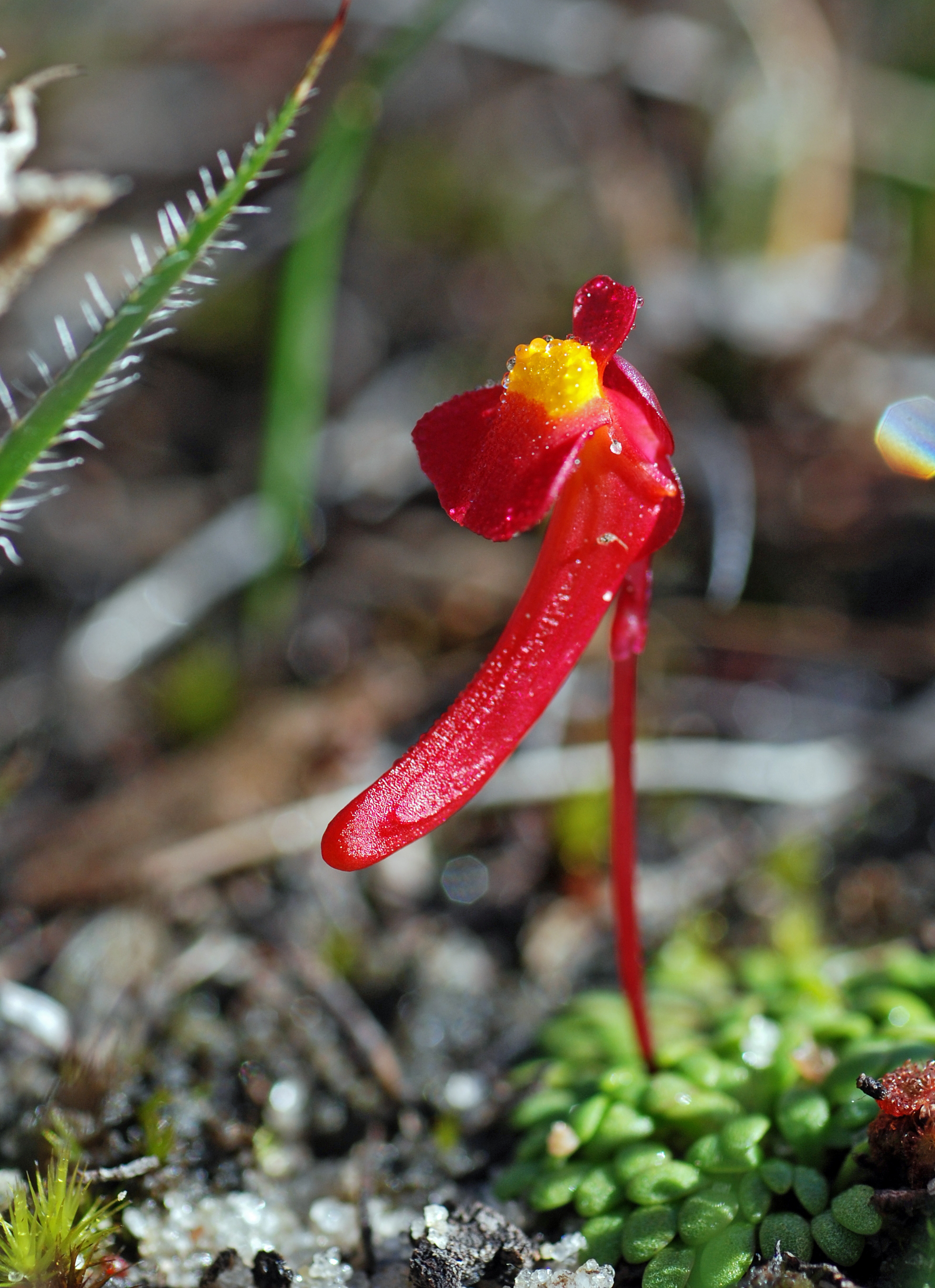

Scientific classification
- Kingdom: Plantae
- Clade: Tracheophytes
- Clade: Angiosperms
- Clade: Eudicots
- Clade: Asterids
- Order: Lamiales
- Family: Lentibulariaceae
- Genus: Utricularia
- Subgenus: Utricularia subg. Polypompholyx
- Section: Utricularia sect. Pleiochasia
- Species: U. menziesii

Binomial name
- Utricularia menziesii R.Br. 1810

Synonyms
- U. macroceras A.DC. U. menziesii var. macroceras A.DC.

= Utricularia menziesii =

Species of carnivorous plant

Utricularia menziesii, commonly known as the redcoats, is a perennial, terrestrial carnivorous plant that belongs to the genus Utricularia (family Lentibulariaceae). It is endemic to the coastal regions of Western Australia.

== See also ==
- List of Utricularia species
