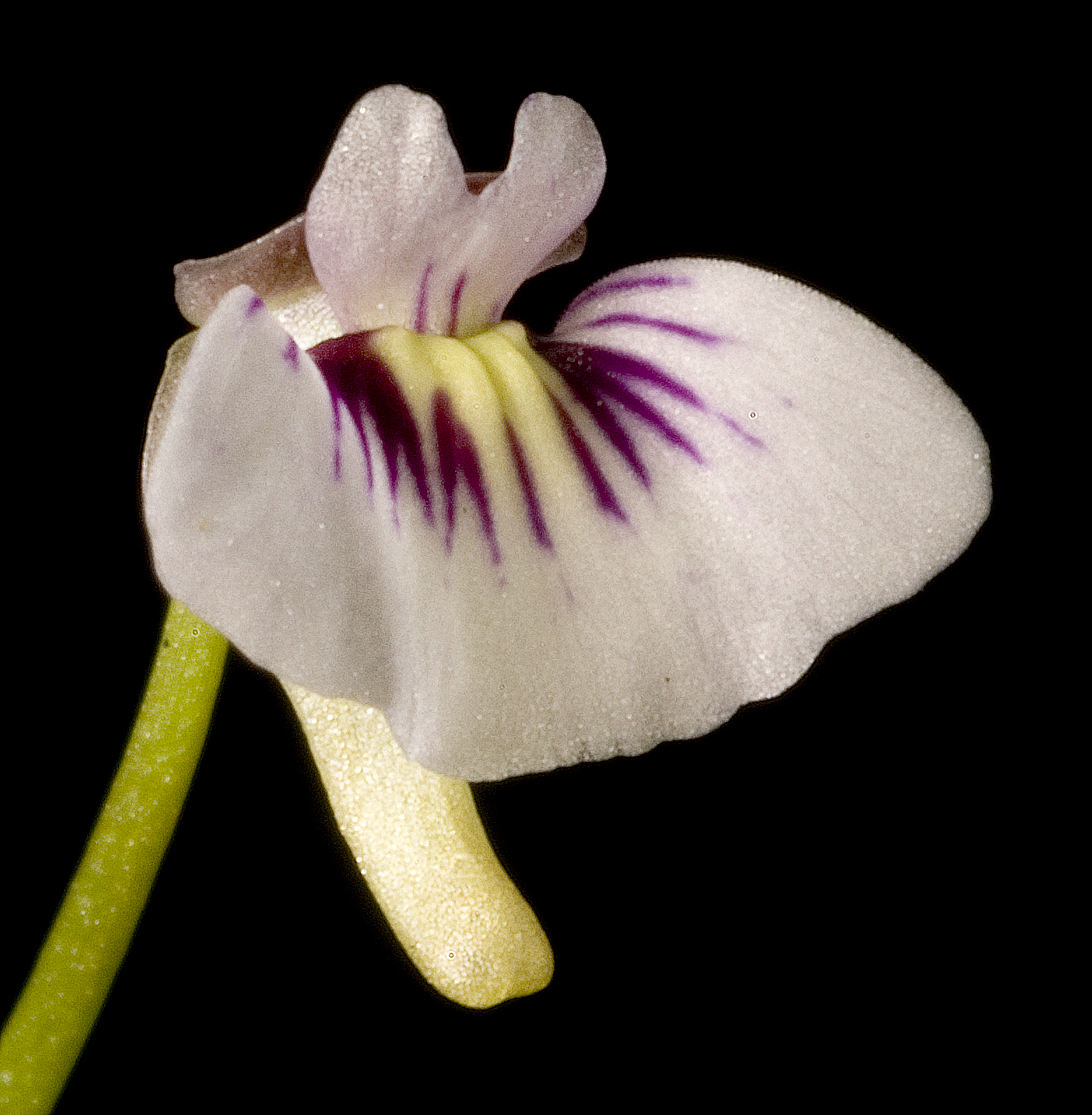

Scientific classification
- Kingdom: Plantae
- Clade: Tracheophytes
- Clade: Angiosperms
- Clade: Eudicots
- Clade: Asterids
- Order: Lamiales
- Family: Lentibulariaceae
- Genus: Utricularia
- Subgenus: Utricularia subg. Polypompholyx
- Section: Utricularia sect. Pleiochasia
- Species: U. violacea

Binomial name
- Utricularia violacea R.Br. 1810

Synonyms
- U. perminuta F.Muell. 1868

= Utricularia violacea =

Species of plant

Utricularia violacea, the violet bladderwort, is an annual, terrestrial carnivorous plant that belongs to the genus Utricularia (family Lentibulariaceae). Its native range includes Western Australia, South Australia, Victoria, and Tasmania.

== See also ==
- List of Utricularia species
