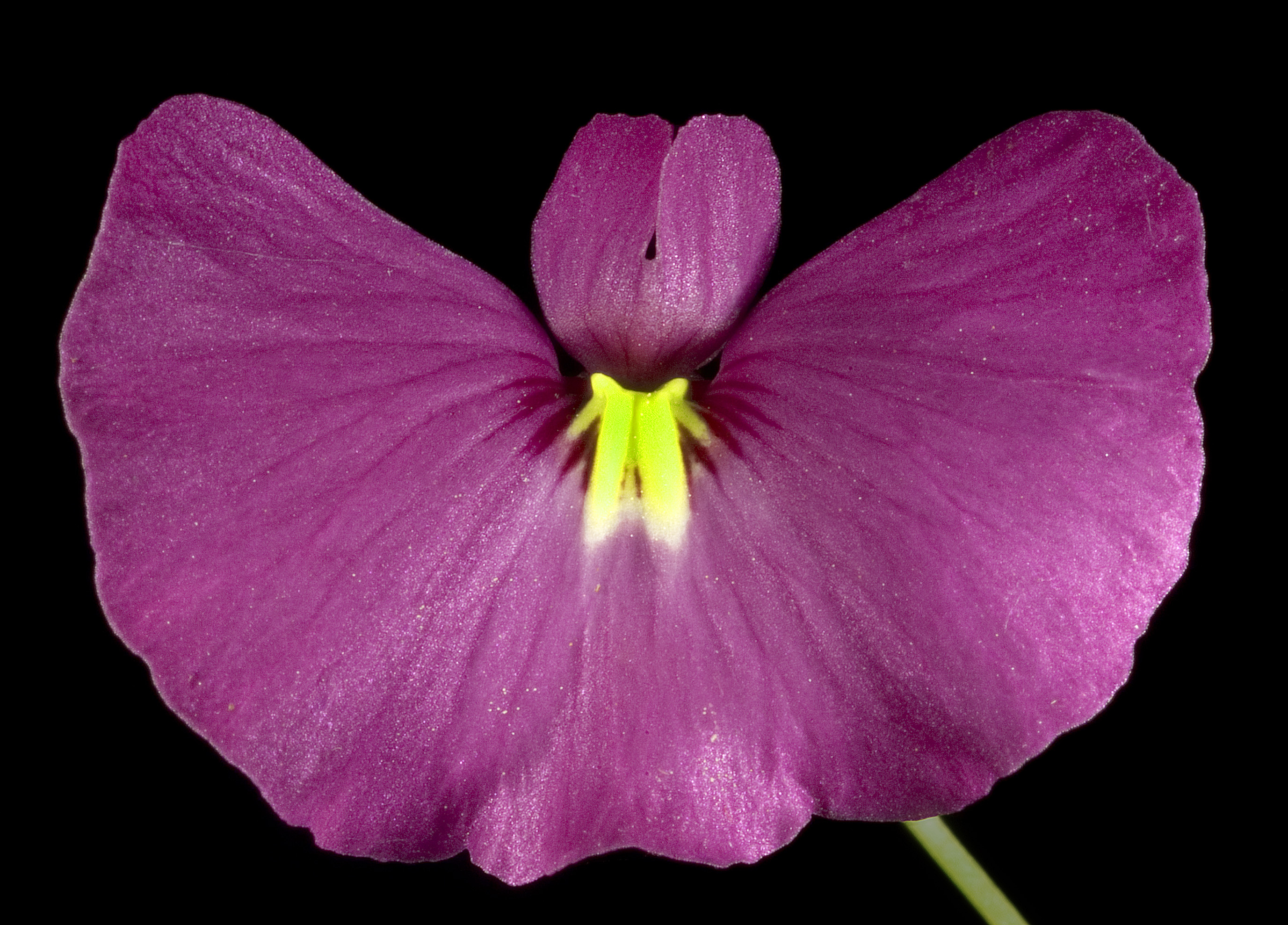

Scientific classification
- Kingdom: Plantae
- Clade: Embryophytes
- Clade: Tracheophytes
- Clade: Spermatophytes
- Clade: Angiosperms
- Clade: Eudicots
- Clade: Asterids
- Order: Lamiales
- Family: Lentibulariaceae
- Genus: Utricularia
- Subgenus: Utricularia subg. Polypompholyx
- Section: Utricularia sect. Pleiochasia
- Species: U. petertaylorii

Binomial name
- Utricularia petertaylorii Lowrie 2002

= Utricularia petertaylorii =

Species of carnivorous plant

Utricularia petertaylorii is an annual terrestrial carnivorous plant that belongs to the genus Utricularia (family Lentibulariaceae). It is endemic to southwestern Western Australia. It is named in honor of Peter Taylor.

== See also ==
- List of Utricularia species
