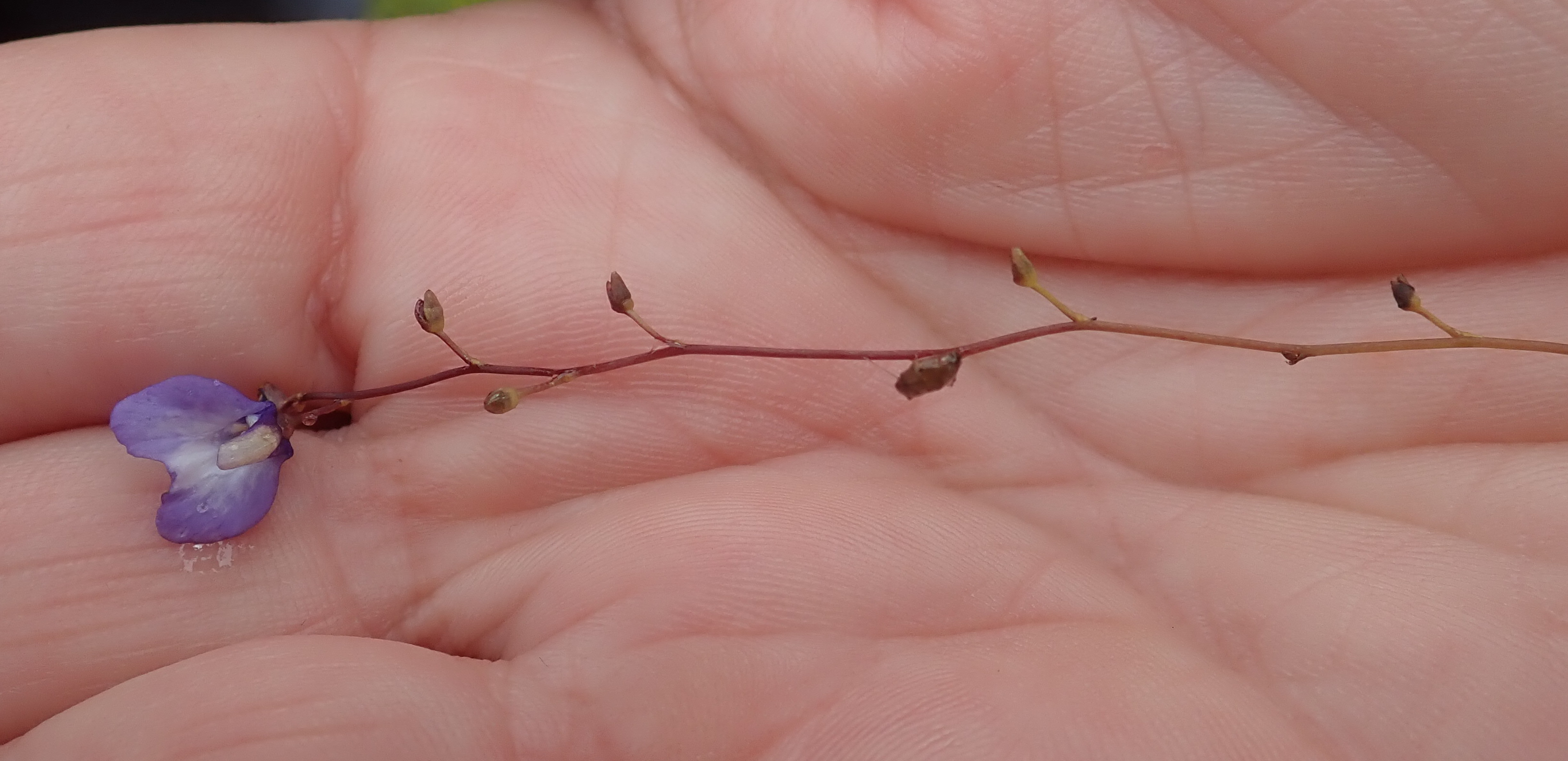
- Utricularia biloba, Cooloola, QLD

Scientific classification
- Kingdom: Plantae
- Clade: Tracheophytes
- Clade: Angiosperms
- Clade: Eudicots
- Clade: Asterids
- Order: Lamiales
- Family: Lentibulariaceae
- Genus: Utricularia
- Subgenus: Utricularia subg. Utricularia
- Section: Utricularia sect. Nelipus
- Species: U. biloba

Binomial name
- Utricularia biloba R.Br. 1810

Synonyms
- Nelipus biloba (R.Br.) Raf. 1838; U. baueri R.Br. 1810; U. lawsonii Lloyd 1936

= Utricularia biloba =

Species of carnivorous plant

Utricularia biloba, the moth bladderwort, is a perennial, terrestrial or aquatic carnivorous plant that belongs to the genus Utricularia (family Lentibulariaceae). It is endemic to Australia with a distribution along the coastal regions of New South Wales and Queensland.

== See also ==
- List of Utricularia species
