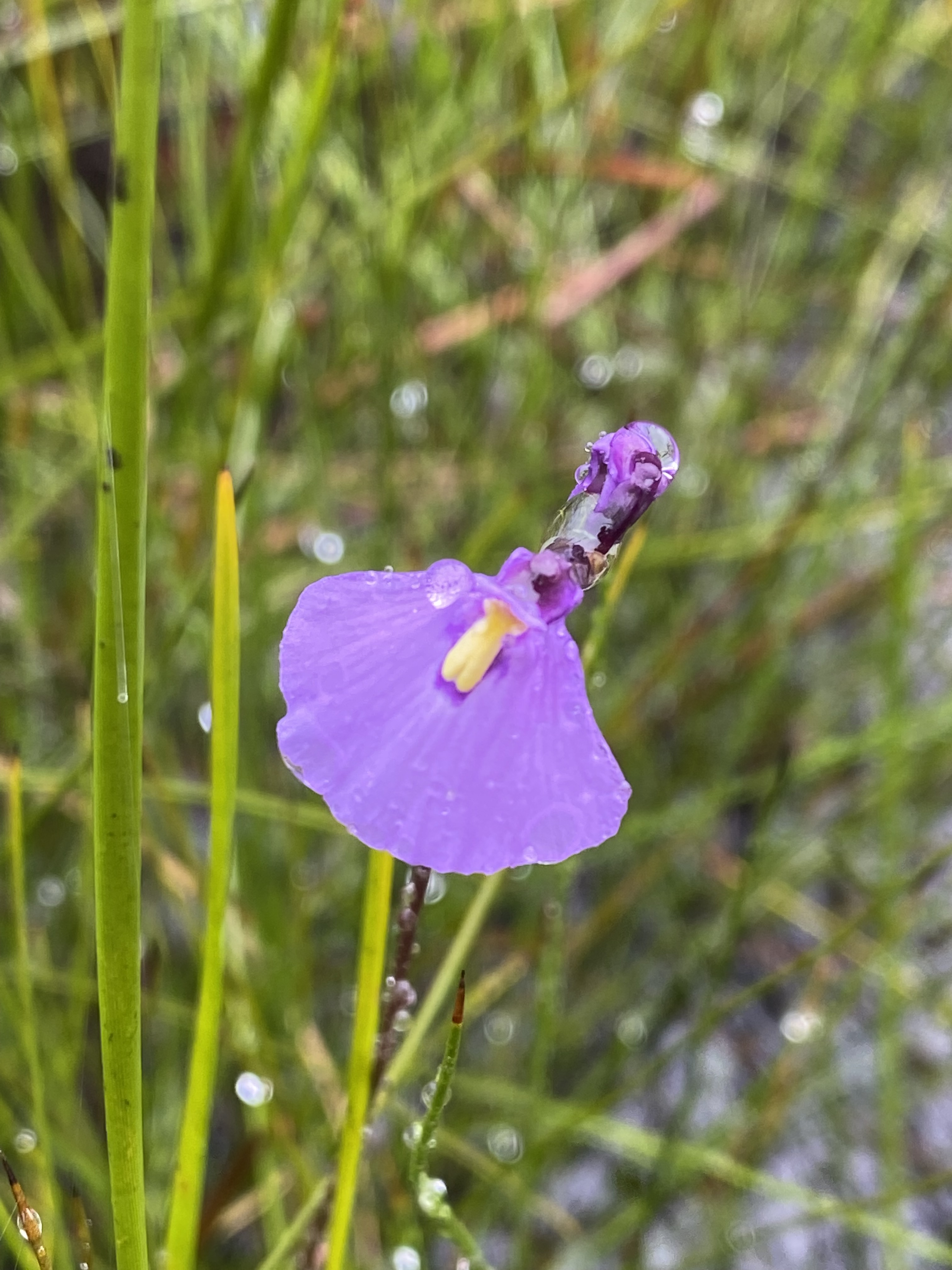

Conservation status
- Least Concern (IUCN 3.1)

Scientific classification
- Kingdom: Plantae
- Clade: Tracheophytes
- Clade: Angiosperms
- Clade: Eudicots
- Clade: Asterids
- Order: Lamiales
- Family: Lentibulariaceae
- Genus: Utricularia
- Subgenus: Utricularia subg. Polypompholyx
- Section: Utricularia sect. Pleiochasia
- Species: U. dichotoma

Binomial name
- Utricularia dichotoma Labill.

Synonyms
- Pleiochasia dichotoma (Labill.) Barnhart; Utricularia billardieri F.Muell., nom. superf.; Utricularia dichotoma var. typica Domin, not validly publ.

= Utricularia dichotoma =

Species of carnivorous plant

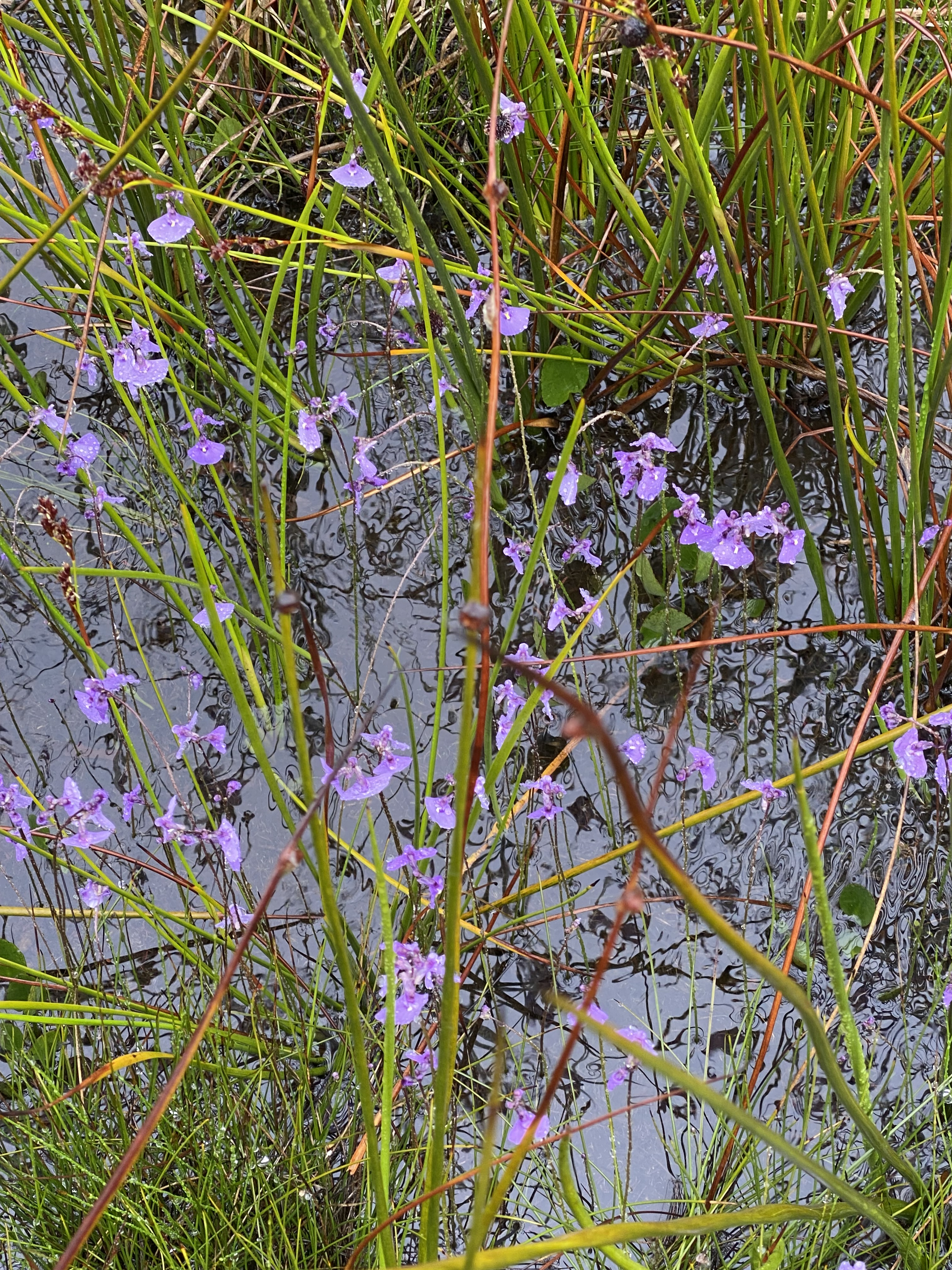
Habit

Utricularia dichotoma, commonly known as fairy aprons, is a variable, perennial species of terrestrial bladderwort. It has mauve or purple fan-shaped flowers on a slender stalk and usually grows in wet locations. It is a widespread species in Australia and New Zealand, and was first described in 1805.

== Description ==
Utricularia dichotoma is a perennial herb with numerous underground trailing stems with bladders 1.5–2 mm (0.06–0.08 in) in diameter. It has absent or a few oval, spoon-shaped to narrow-lanceolate leaves 2–4 mm (0.08–0.16 in) long and up to 40 mm (1.6 in) long. The former is more typical of plants growing in wet soil, the latter of plants growing fully submerged. The flowers are borne on a slender, wiry stem 5–50 cm (2.0–19.7 in) long; they are solitary, paired or in whorls of three or four in clusters near the end of the stem. They are mauve or purple and have a small upper petal and a broader, semicircular lower lip 1–2 cm (0.4–0.8 in) wide with two or three prominent white or yellow markings, and the corolla is 12–22 mm (0.5–0.9 in) long. Flowering occurs from August to April and the fruit is a globular capsule up to 4 mm (0.16 in) wide.

== Taxonomy ==
Utricularia dichotoma was first formally described in 1805 by Jacques Labillardière and the description was published in Novae Hollandiae Plantarum Specimen. The specific epithet (dichotoma) is Latin for "dividing into pairs" and refers to the double arrangement of flowers which this species often displays.

=== Infraspecies ===
As of February 2025, Plants of the World Online accepts the following 8 subspecies:

- Utricularia dichotoma subsp. aquilonia R.W.Jobson
- Utricularia dichotoma subsp. dichotoma – autonym
- Utricularia dichotoma subsp. fontana R.W.Jobson
- Utricularia dichotoma subsp. maritima R.W.Jobson
- Utricularia dichotoma subsp. monanthos (Hook.f.) R.W.Jobson
- Utricularia dichotoma subsp. novae-angliae R.W.Jobson
- Utricularia dichotoma subsp. novae-zelandiae (Hook.f.) R.W.Jobson
- Utricularia dichotoma subsp. oxleyensis R.W.Jobson

== Distribution and habitat ==
The fairy apron is native to New Caledonia, New Zealand and Australia. It occurs on the North and South Islands in New Zealand, as well as Stewart Island / Rakiura, the most southerly location at which a member of this genus occurs. In Australia it is found in all states, but the majority of occurrences is in New South Wales, Victoria and Tasmania. It grows in moist and wet locations.
