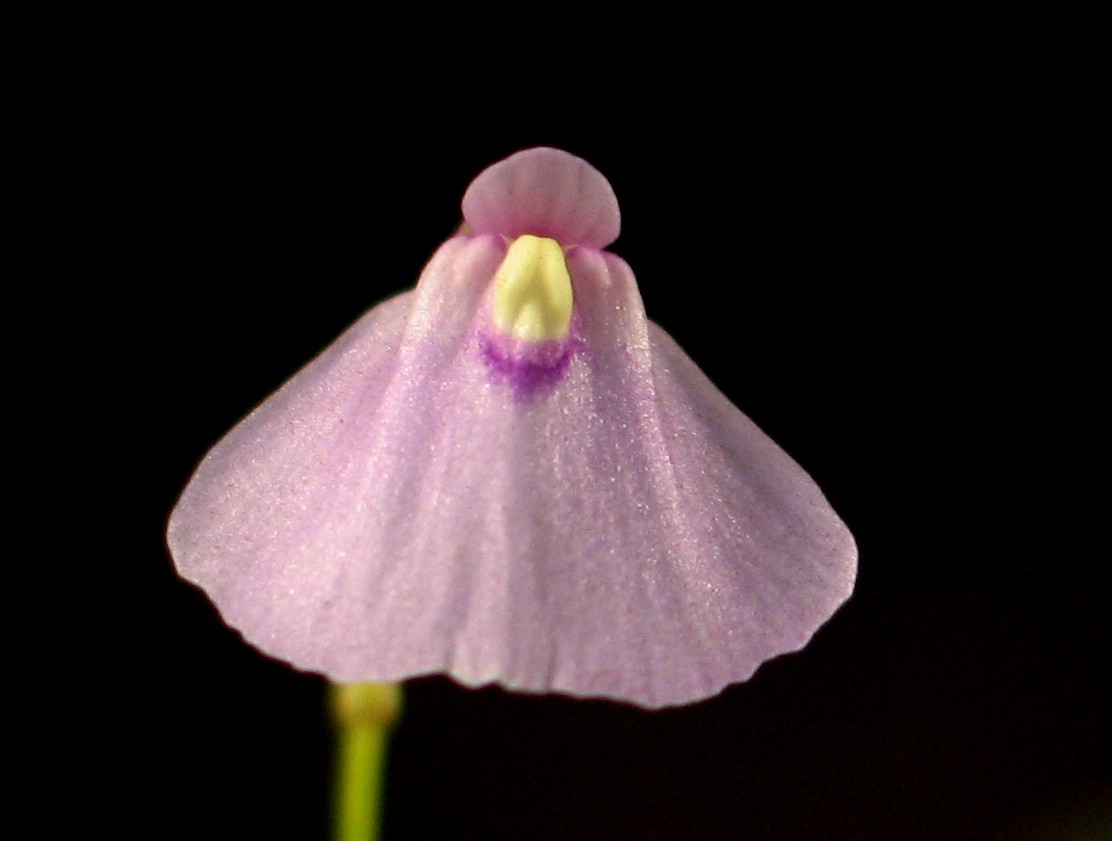
- Utricularia dichotoma, a member of section Pleiochasia.

Scientific classification
- Kingdom: Plantae
- Clade: Tracheophytes
- Clade: Angiosperms
- Clade: Eudicots
- Clade: Asterids
- Order: Lamiales
- Family: Lentibulariaceae
- Genus: Utricularia
- Subgenus: Utricularia subg. Polypompholyx (Lehm.) P.Taylor

Sections
- Pleiochasia; Polypompholyx; Tridentaria

= Utricularia subg. Polypompholyx =

Subgenus of carnivorous plants

Utricularia subg. Polypompholyx is a subgenus in the genus Utricularia. Polypompholyx is supported as the sister group to the clade of subgenera Utricularia and Bivalvaria. Within the genus Utricularia, Polypompholyx's sections Polypompholyx, Tridentaria, and Pleiochasia are the most primitive due to their tricolporate pollen type.

== See also ==
- List of Utricularia species
- Utricularia
