= Lentibulariaceae =

Scientific classification
- Kingdom: Plantae
- Clade: Tracheophytes
- Clade: Angiosperms
- Clade: Eudicots
- Clade: Asterids
- Order: Lamiales
- Family: Lentibulariaceae; Rich.

Genera
- Genlisea; Pinguicula; Utricularia

Family of carnivorous plants

Lentibulariaceae is a family of carnivorous plants containing three genera: Genlisea, the corkscrew plants; Pinguicula, the butterworts; and Utricularia, the bladderworts.

The genera Polypompholyx (two species of pink petticoats or fairy aprons) and Biovularia used to be regarded as fourth and fifth members of this family. Biovularia has been subsumed into Utricularia, and Polypompholyx has been relegated to a subgenus of Utricularia. Placement of the family used to be in the Scrophulariales, which has been merged with Lamiales in the Angiosperm Phylogeny Group system.

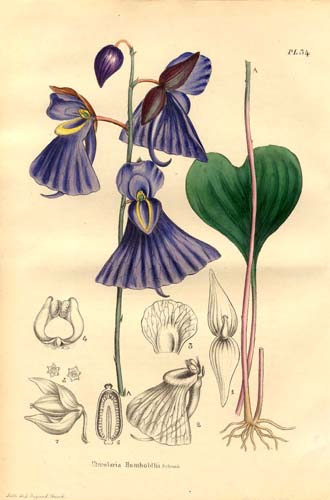
Lentibulariaceae - Utricularia humboldtii

== Evolution ==
Carnivory in plants appears to have evolved independently in five major angiosperm lineages and six orders: Poales, Caryophyllales, Oxalidales, Ericales, Alismatales and Lamiales.

One common trait found in several Lamiales families that may have led to carnivory is the secretion of proteinase mucilage through leaf surfaces. This mucilage is generally used to prevent insect predation by trapping and degrading potentially harmful insects. Some research suggests these glands can quite easily shift their function from secretion to absorption. This shift may have first occurred in the most recent common ancestor (MRCA) of the Lentibulariaceae, introducing absorptive glands that provided additional macronutrients through trapped insects. The additional source of nutrients may have increased fitness of plants growing in low-nutrient habitats which eventually caused an embrace of carnivory. Further mapping of traits also suggests the MRCA was terrestrial and possessed a basal rosette composed of flat leaves and a primary root. Phylogenetics also confirmed that the Pinguicula are sister to the other two genera.
