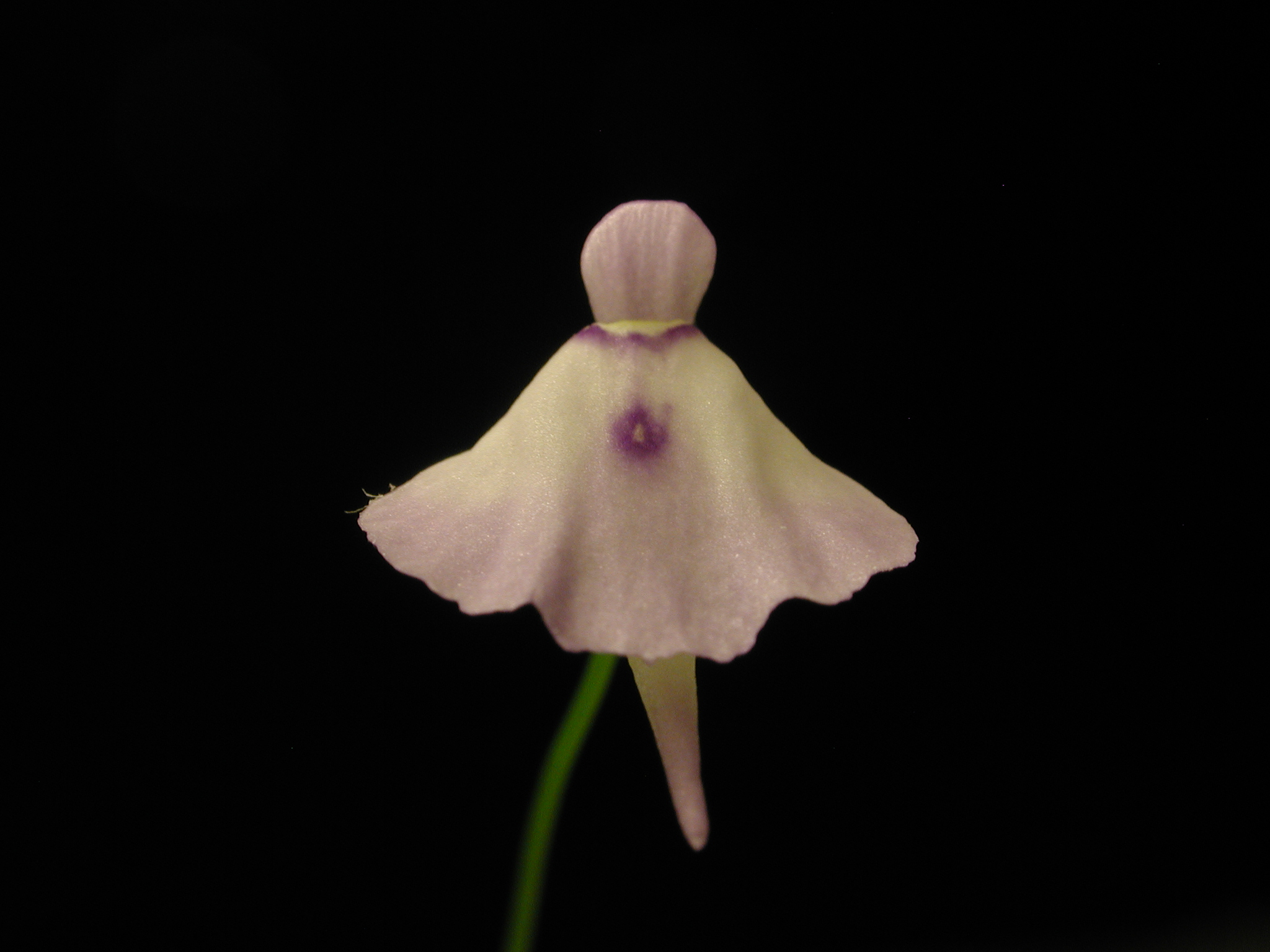

Scientific classification
- Kingdom: Plantae
- Clade: Tracheophytes
- Clade: Angiosperms
- Clade: Eudicots
- Clade: Asterids
- Order: Lamiales
- Family: Lentibulariaceae
- Genus: Utricularia
- Subgenus: Utricularia subg. Bivalvaria
- Section: Utricularia sect. Lloydia; P.Taylor
- Species: U. pubescens

Binomial name
- Utricularia pubescens Sm.

= Utricularia pubescens =

Species of carnivorous plant

Utricularia pubescens is a small to medium-sized, probably annual, terrestrial or lithophytic carnivorous plant that belongs to the genus Utricularia and is the only member of Utricularia sect. Lloydia. U. pubescens is native to India, tropical Africa, and Central and South America. It was originally published and described by James Edward Smith in 1819 and placed in its own section, Lloydia, by Peter Taylor in 1986. It grows as a terrestrial or lithophytic plant in boggy grasslands in damp peaty soils at altitudes from sea level to 1,900 m (6,234 ft). This species possesses small peltate leaves, which are diagnostic for this species in the genus.

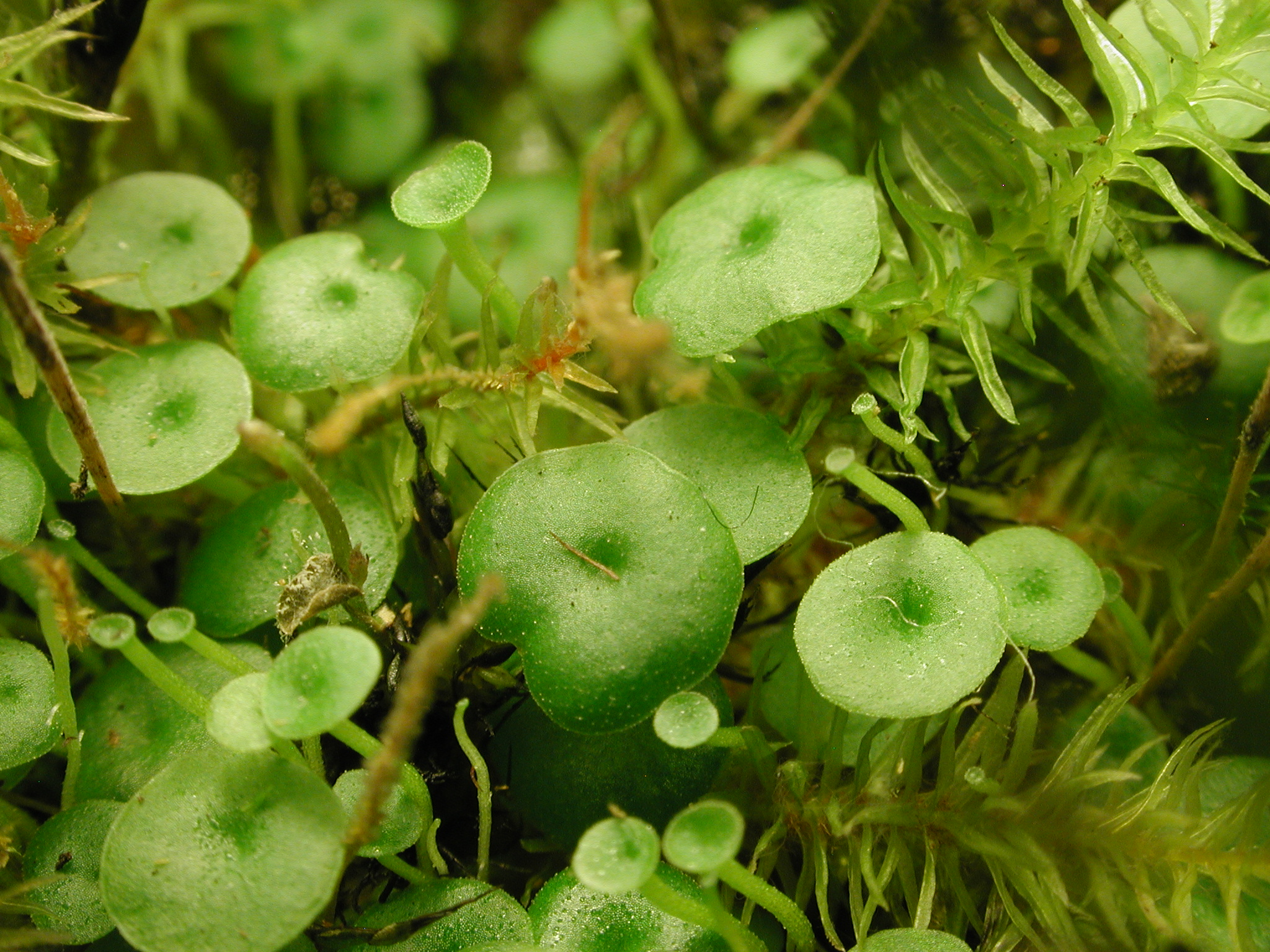
leaves of Utricularia pubescens

== Synonyms ==
Utricularia pubescens is an extremely variable species and its distribution covers a large native range, two factors that have led to a considerable amount of synonymy.

- [U. capensis Kamieński]
- U. connellii N.E.Br.
- U. deightonii F.E.Lloyd & G.Taylor
- U. fernaldiana F.E.Lloyd & G.Taylor
- [U. firmula Hutch. & Dalziel]
- U. graniticola A.Chev. & Pellegr.
- U. hydrocotyloides F.E.Lloyd & G.Taylor
- [U. nivea Afzel. ex Kamieński]
- U. papillosa Stapf
- [U. pauciflora Afzel. ex Kamieński]
- U. peltata Spruce ex Oliv.
- U. peltatifolia A.Chev. & Pellegr.
- U. puberula Benj.
- U. regnellii Sylvén
- U. sciaphila Tutin
- U. subpeltata Steyerm.
- U. thomasii F.E.Lloyd & G.Taylor
- U. venezuelana Steyerm.

== See also ==
- List of Utricularia species
