= Utricularia macrocheilos =

Scientific classification
- Kingdom: Plantae
- Clade: Tracheophytes
- Clade: Angiosperms
- Clade: Eudicots
- Clade: Asterids
- Order: Lamiales
- Family: Lentibulariaceae
- Genus: Utricularia
- Subgenus: Utricularia subg. Bivalvaria
- Section: Utricularia sect. Oligocista
- Species: U. macrocheilos

Binomial name
- Utricularia macrocheilos (P.Taylor) P.Taylor

Synonyms
- [U. micropetala Hutch. & Dalziel]; U. micropetala var. macrocheilos P.Taylor; [U. prehensilis Pellegr.]

Species of carnivorous plant

Utricularia macrocheilos is a small annual carnivorous plant that belongs to the genus Utricularia. It is endemic to western tropical Africa, where it is only known from the mountain ranges of Guinea and Sierra Leone. U. macrocheilos grows as a terrestrial plant among wet rocks at medium altitudes. It flowers between August and January. A specimen of U. macrocheilos was originally included in the description of U. prehensilis by François Pellegrin in 1914 and also in John Hutchinson and Nicol Alexander Dalzell's 1931 description of U. micropetala. Peter Taylor recognized these specimens as a different taxon in a 1963 review of African species and treated it as a variety of U. micropetala. After further discussions with other botanists and review of the specimens, he elevated the variety to the species level in 1986 as U. macrocheilos. Compared to U. micropetala, U. macrocheilos has much longer corolla lips and less acute fruiting calyx lobe apices. Taylor notes, however, that the vegetative body of the plants and the seeds appear to be identical.

== See also ==
- List of Utricularia species
