= Utricularia recta =

Scientific classification
- Kingdom: Plantae
- Clade: Tracheophytes
- Clade: Angiosperms
- Clade: Eudicots
- Clade: Asterids
- Order: Lamiales
- Family: Lentibulariaceae
- Genus: Utricularia
- Subgenus: Utricularia subg. Bivalvaria
- Section: Utricularia sect. Oligocista
- Species: U. recta

Binomial name
- Utricularia recta P.Taylor

Synonyms
- U. scandens var. firmula (Oliv.) Subr. & Banerjee; U. wallichiana var. firmula Oliv.

Species of carnivorous plant

Utricularia recta is a small, probably annual carnivorous plant that belongs to the genus Utricularia. It is native to Bhutan, China, India, and Nepal. Utricularia recta grows as a terrestrial plant in marshes and bogs from altitudes around 900 m (2,953 ft) to 4,000 m (13,123 ft).

It was originally described as a variety of Utricularia wallichiana by Daniel Oliver in 1859. It was later transferred to a variety of Utricularia scandens by Krishnaier Subramanyam and Banerjee in 1968. Peter Taylor elevated the variety to the specific rank in 1986 upon further review of its morphological characteristics.

== See also ==
- List of Utricularia species
