= Utricularia foveolata =

Scientific classification
- Kingdom: Plantae
- Clade: Tracheophytes
- Clade: Angiosperms
- Clade: Eudicots
- Clade: Asterids
- Order: Lamiales
- Family: Lentibulariaceae
- Genus: Utricularia
- Subgenus: Utricularia subg. Bivalvaria
- Section: Utricularia sect. Oligocista
- Species: U. foveolata

Binomial name
- Utricularia foveolata Edgew.

Synonyms
- U. baoulensis A.Chev.; [U. perpusilla H.Perrier]; U. scandens Oliv.; [U. spiralis Hutch. & Dalziel]; U. tenerrima Merr.

Species of carnivorous plant

Utricularia foveolata is a small, probably annual, carnivorous plant that belongs to the genus Utricularia. It is native to the Old World tropics, where it can be found in Africa (Chad, Côte d'Ivoire, the Democratic Republic of the Congo, Ghana, Madagascar, Mali, Mozambique, Nigeria, Tanzania, Uganda, Zambia), Asia (China, India, the Philippines, Thailand), Australia, and on the eastern end of Java. U. foveolata grows as a terrestrial or subaquatic plant in wet soils or in shallow water, sometimes as a weed in rice fields in Asia. It was originally described and published by Michael Pakenham Edgeworth in 1847.

== See also ==
- List of Utricularia species
