= Utricularia pobeguinii =

Conservation status
- Endangered (IUCN 3.1)

Scientific classification
- Kingdom: Plantae
- Clade: Tracheophytes
- Clade: Angiosperms
- Clade: Eudicots
- Clade: Asterids
- Order: Lamiales
- Family: Lentibulariaceae
- Genus: Utricularia
- Subgenus: Utricularia subg. Bivalvaria
- Section: Utricularia sect. Oligocista
- Species: U. pobeguinii

Binomial name
- Utricularia pobeguinii Pellegr.

Synonyms
- U. spiralis var. pobeguinii (Pellegr.) P.Taylor

Species of carnivorous plant

Utricularia pobeguinii is a small annual carnivorous plant that belongs to the genus Utricularia.

== Distribution and habitat ==
It is endemic to Africa and is only found in the region around Kindia, Guinea. U. pobeguinii grows as a terrestrial plant in wet soils among sandstone at altitudes from 500 m (1,640 ft) to 1,000 m (3,281 ft). It was originally described by François Pellegrin in 1914, reduced to a variety of U. spiralis by Peter Taylor in 1963, and later elevated back to the species level by Taylor upon further investigation.

== See also ==
- List of Utricularia species
