= Utricularia spiralis =

Scientific classification
- Kingdom: Plantae
- Clade: Tracheophytes
- Clade: Angiosperms
- Clade: Eudicots
- Clade: Asterids
- Order: Lamiales
- Family: Lentibulariaceae
- Genus: Utricularia
- Subgenus: Utricularia subg. Bivalvaria
- Section: Utricularia sect. Oligocista
- Species: U. spiralis

Binomial name
- Utricularia spiralis Sm.

Synonyms
- Nelipus spiralis (Sm.) Raf.; Utricularia baumii Kamieński; U. baumii var. leptocheilos Pellegr.; [U. caerulea Warb.]; U. paradoxa F.E.Lloyd; U. paradoxa F.E.Lloyd & G.Taylor; [U. reticulata Oliv.]; U. spiralis var. spiralis P.Taylor

Species of carnivorous plant

Utricularia spiralis is a medium to large-sized, probably perennial carnivorous plant that belongs to the genus Utricularia. It is endemic to tropical Africa and can be found in Angola, Burundi, Chad, Côte d'Ivoire, the Democratic Republic of the Congo, Gabon, Guinea, Liberia, Malawi, Sierra Leone, Tanzania, and Zambia. U. spiralis grows as a terrestrial plant in swamps or marshes in peaty or sandy soils at altitudes from sea level to 1,860 m (6,102 ft). It was originally described by James Edward Smith in 1819.

== See also ==
- List of Utricularia species
