= Utricularia tortilis =

Scientific classification
- Kingdom: Plantae
- Clade: Tracheophytes
- Clade: Angiosperms
- Clade: Eudicots
- Clade: Asterids
- Order: Lamiales
- Family: Lentibulariaceae
- Genus: Utricularia
- Subgenus: Utricularia subg. Bivalvaria
- Section: Utricularia sect. Oligocista
- Species: U. tortilis

Binomial name
- Utricularia tortilis Welw. ex Oliv.

Synonyms
- [U. caerulea Oliv.]; U. falcata R.D.Good; U. gyrans Suess.; [U. prehensilis var. parviflora De Wild.]; [U. spiralis Stapf]; U. spiralis var. tortilis (Welw. ex Oliv.) P.Taylor; U. tortilis var. andongensis Kamieński; [U. uliginoides Kamieński]

Species of carnivorous plant

Utricularia tortilis is a small to medium-sized annual carnivorous plant that belongs to the genus Utricularia. It is endemic to tropical Africa and can be found in Angola, Botswana, Burundi, the Central African Republic, Côte d'Ivoire, the Democratic Republic of the Congo, Ghana, Guinea, Guinea-Bissau, Kenya, Liberia, Mali, Nigeria, the Republic of the Congo, Senegal, Sierra Leone, Tanzania, Togo, Uganda, Zambia, and Zimbabwe. U. tortilis grows as a terrestrial plant in swamps or marshes in peaty or sandy soils at altitudes from sea level to 1,860 m (6,102 ft). It was originally described by Friedrich Welwitsch but validly published by Daniel Oliver in 1865.

== See also ==
- List of Utricularia species
