= Utricularia andongensis =

Conservation status
- Least Concern (IUCN 3.1)

Scientific classification
- Kingdom: Plantae
- Clade: Tracheophytes
- Clade: Angiosperms
- Clade: Eudicots
- Clade: Asterids
- Order: Lamiales
- Family: Lentibulariaceae
- Genus: Utricularia
- Subgenus: Utricularia subg. Bivalvaria
- Section: Utricularia sect. Oligocista
- Species: U. andongensis

Binomial name
- Utricularia andongensis Welw. ex Hiern

Synonyms
- U. conferta Kamieński; U. prehensilis var. parviflora Oliv.; U. tortilis var. andongensis (Welw. ex Hiern) Kamieński

Species of carnivorous plant

Utricularia andongensis is a small, probably perennial, carnivorous plant that belongs to the family Lentibulariaceae. It is endemic to tropical Africa, where it can be found in Angola, Cameroon, the Central African Republic, the Democratic Republic of the Congo, Gabon, Guinea, Liberia, Nigeria, Sierra Leone, Sudan, Tanzania, Togo, Uganda, and Zambia. U. andongensis grows as a terrestrial or lithophytic plant on wet, bare rocks or among mosses in grasslands at altitudes from 240 m (787 ft) to 1,800 m (5,906 ft). It was originally named by Friedrich Welwitsch but formally described and published by William Philip Hiern in 1900.

== See also ==
- List of Utricularia species
