= Utricularia densiflora =

Scientific classification
- Kingdom: Plantae
- Clade: Tracheophytes
- Clade: Angiosperms
- Clade: Eudicots
- Clade: Asterids
- Order: Lamiales
- Family: Lentibulariaceae
- Genus: Utricularia
- Subgenus: Utricularia subg. Bivalvaria
- Section: Utricularia sect. Oligocista
- Species: U. densiflora

Binomial name
- Utricularia densiflora Baleeiro & C.P.Bove

Species of carnivorous plant

Utricularia densiflora is a carnivorous plant in the genus Utricularia and is endemic to Brazil. It is a hydrophytic herb that has stolons up to 8 centimetres (3.1 in) long. It produces inflorescences around 10 centimetres (3.9 in) long with the bracts and flowers arranged spirally around the inflorescence. The species epithet densiflora refers to the density of flowers that each plant produces, which typically ranges from 15 to 23 flowers congested near the top of the inflorescence. Beneath the lowermost opened flower, there are several rudimentary or dormant flower buds that make it unique in the genus, along with other diagnostic characteristics. It is most similar morphologically to U. erectiflora and U. meyeri.

Utricularia densiflora is only known from one location near the Serra da Baleia in the Chapada dos Veadeiros National Park in Goiás state, Brazil. It grows in natural pools of water about 7 centimetres (2.8 in) deep in the grasslands, growing sympatrically with Eriocaulon aff. heteropeplon. The type specimen was collected at an elevation of 1,100 metres (3,600 ft) in 2009 and was formally described by Paulo Cesar Baleeiro Souza and Claudia Petean Bove in 2011.

== See also ==
- List of Utricularia species
