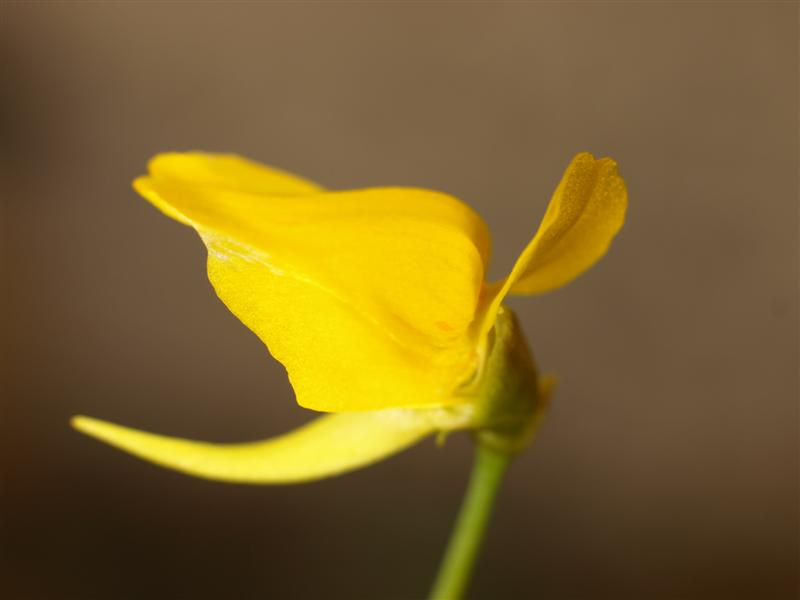

Scientific classification
- Kingdom: Plantae
- Clade: Tracheophytes
- Clade: Angiosperms
- Clade: Eudicots
- Clade: Asterids
- Order: Lamiales
- Family: Lentibulariaceae
- Genus: Utricularia
- Subgenus: Utricularia subg. Bivalvaria
- Section: Utricularia sect. Oligocista
- Species: U. laxa

Binomial name
- Utricularia laxa A.St.-Hil. & Girard

Synonyms
- U. colorata Benj.; [U. cornuta Benj.]; [U. juncea Chodat & Hassler]; U. laxa var. guadichaudii A.St.-Hil. & Girard

= Utricularia laxa =

Species of carnivorous plant

Utricularia laxa is a small to medium-sized annual carnivorous plant that belongs to the genus Utricularia. It is endemic to South America and is found in Argentina, Brazil, Paraguay and Uruguay. The Utricularia laxa grows as a terrestrial plant in wet grasslands and at the margins of pools, usually at elevations from near sea level to 1,100 m (3,609 ft). It was originally described and published by Augustin Saint-Hilaire and Frédéric de Girard in 1838.

== See also ==
- List of Utricularia species
