= Utricularia pierrei =

Scientific classification
- Kingdom: Plantae
- Clade: Tracheophytes
- Clade: Angiosperms
- Clade: Eudicots
- Clade: Asterids
- Order: Lamiales
- Family: Lentibulariaceae
- Genus: Utricularia
- Subgenus: Utricularia subg. Bivalvaria
- Section: Utricularia sect. Oligocista
- Species: U. pierrei

Binomial name
- Utricularia pierrei Pellegr.

Species of carnivorous plant

Utricularia pierrei is a medium-sized, probably perennial carnivorous plant that belongs to the genus Utricularia. It is native to Indochina and can be found in Thailand and southern Vietnam. U. pierrei grows as a terrestrial plant at altitudes around 1,500 m (4,921 ft). It was originally described by François Pellegrin in 1920 in honor of the original collector of the species.

== See also ==
- List of Utricularia species
