= Utricularia rigida =

Scientific classification
- Kingdom: Plantae
- Clade: Tracheophytes
- Clade: Angiosperms
- Clade: Eudicots
- Clade: Asterids
- Order: Lamiales
- Family: Lentibulariaceae
- Genus: Utricularia
- Subgenus: Utricularia subg. Bivalvaria
- Section: Utricularia sect. Avesicarioides
- Species: U. rigida

Binomial name
- Utricularia rigida Benj.

Synonyms
- U. suaveolens Afzel. ex Benj.

Species of carnivorous plant

Utricularia rigida is a small to medium-sized perennial, rheophytic carnivorous plant that belongs to the genus Utricularia. U. rigida is endemic to western tropical Africa, where it can be found in Côte d'Ivoire, Guinea, Guinea-Bissau, Mali, Nigeria, Senegal, and Sierra Leone. It grows as a rheophyte on inclined rock faces in swiftly running water at altitudes from near sea level to 1,250 m (4,101 ft). It was originally described and published by Ludwig Benjamin in 1847. It is distinguished from the other species in the section, U. tetraloba, by having only two lower lip corolla lobes as opposed to U. tetraloba's four.

== See also ==
- List of Utricularia species
