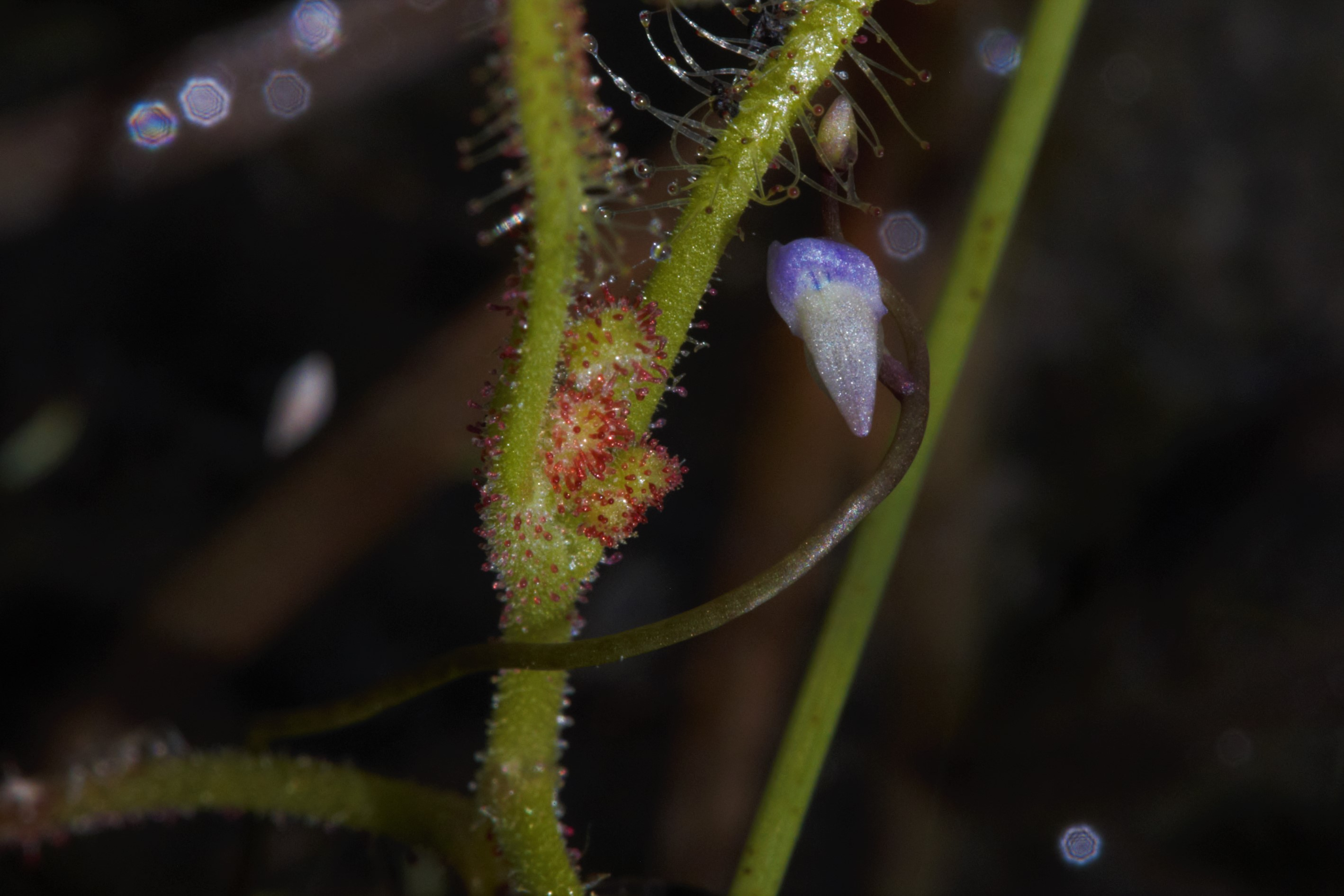
- Utricularia circumvoluta curls itself around Drosera serpens at Davies Creek, Dinden National Park

Scientific classification
- Kingdom: Plantae
- Clade: Tracheophytes
- Clade: Angiosperms
- Clade: Eudicots
- Clade: Asterids
- Order: Lamiales
- Family: Lentibulariaceae
- Genus: Utricularia
- Subgenus: Utricularia subg. Bivalvaria
- Section: Utricularia sect. Oligocista
- Species: U. circumvoluta

Binomial name
- Utricularia circumvoluta P.Taylor

Synonyms
- [U. bifida P.Taylor]; [U. scandens P.Taylor]

= Utricularia circumvoluta =

Species of carnivorous plant

Utricularia circumvoluta is a medium-sized, probably annual, carnivorous plant that belongs to the genus Utricularia. It is endemic to the Northern Territory and Queensland, Australia. U. circumvoluta grows as a terrestrial plant in swamps and near streams or lagoons, usually in shallow water in the company of tall grasses and sedges, which its inflorescence twines up. It was originally described and published by Peter Taylor in 1986. It somewhat resembles U. scandens, which it had been confused for in the past.

== See also ==
- List of Utricularia species
