= Utricularia adpressa =

Scientific classification
- Kingdom: Plantae
- Clade: Embryophytes
- Clade: Tracheophytes
- Clade: Angiosperms
- Clade: Eudicots
- Clade: Asterids
- Order: Lamiales
- Family: Lentibulariaceae
- Genus: Utricularia
- Subgenus: Utricularia subg. Bivalvaria
- Section: Utricularia sect. Oligocista
- Species: U. adpressa

Binomial name
- Utricularia adpressa Salzm. ex A.St.-Hil. & Girard

Synonyms
- U. aureola S.F.Blake; U. aureolimba Steyerm.

Species of carnivorous plant

Utricularia adpressa is a small, probably annual, carnivorous plant that belongs to the genus Utricularia. It is endemic to Central and South America and is found in Belize, Brazil, French Guiana, Guyana, Suriname, Trinidad, and Venezuela. It was also said to be collected from Colombia by Alvaro Fernández-Pérez, but those specimens are actually U. chiribiquitensis. U. adpressa grows as a terrestrial plant in wet sandy savannas at altitudes from near sea level to 1,250 m (4,101 ft). It was originally named by Philipp Salzmann but formally described and published by Augustin Saint-Hilaire and Frédéric de Girard in 1838.

== See also ==
- List of Utricularia species
