= Utricularia malabarica =

Scientific classification
- Kingdom: Plantae
- Clade: Tracheophytes
- Clade: Angiosperms
- Clade: Eudicots
- Clade: Asterids
- Order: Lamiales
- Family: Lentibulariaceae
- Genus: Utricularia
- Subgenus: Utricularia subg. Bivalvaria
- Section: Utricularia sect. Oligocista
- Species: U. malabarica

Binomial name
- Utricularia malabarica Janarth. & A.N.Henry

Species of carnivorous plant

Utricularia malabarica is a small annual carnivorous plant that belongs to the genus Utricularia. It is endemic to southern India and has been collected from the Kasaragod district. U. malabarica grows over wet rocks or lateritic soils in the presence of Eriocaulon species and grasses. It was originally collected by M. K. Janarthanam in 1985 and was formally described by Janarthanam and Ambrose Nathaniel Henry in 1989. It is most closely related to U. lazulina.

== See also ==
- List of Utricularia species
