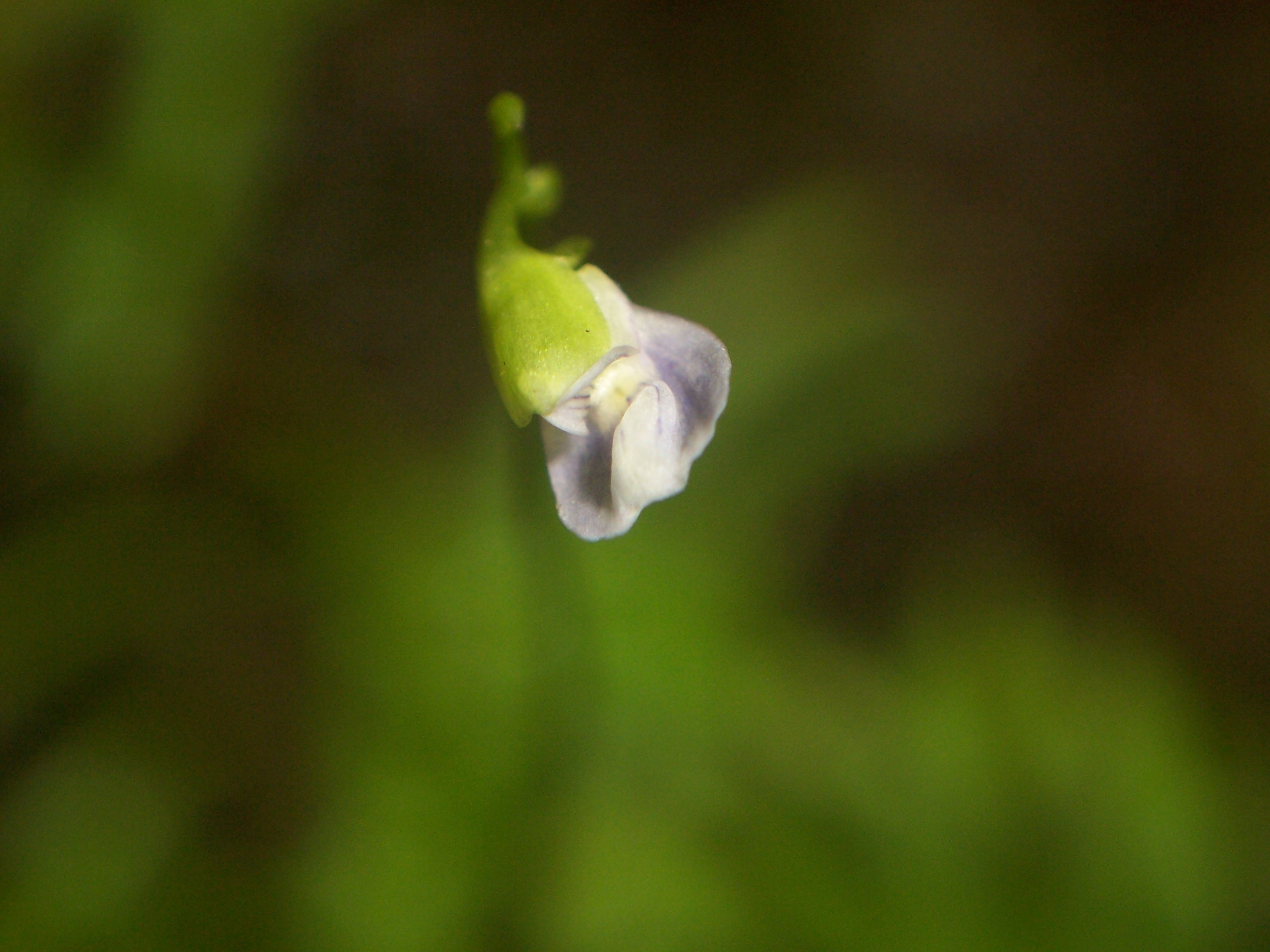

Scientific classification
- Kingdom: Plantae
- Clade: Tracheophytes
- Clade: Angiosperms
- Clade: Eudicots
- Clade: Asterids
- Order: Lamiales
- Family: Lentibulariaceae
- Genus: Utricularia
- Subgenus: Utricularia subg. Bivalvaria
- Section: Utricularia sect. Oligocista
- Species: U. uliginosa

Binomial name
- Utricularia uliginosa Vahl

= Utricularia uliginosa =

Species of plant

Utricularia uliginosa, the Asian bladderwort, is a small annual carnivorous plant that belongs to the genus Utricularia. It is native to Southeast Asia (Borneo, Burma, Cambodia, China, India, Japan, Java, Korea, Peninsular Malaysia, Sri Lanka, Sumatra, Taiwan, Thailand, and Vietnam), Oceania (Guam, New Caledonia, New Guinea, and Palau), and Australia (New South Wales, the Northern Territory, Queensland, and Western Australia). U. uliginosa grows as a terrestrial or subaquatic plant in seasonally flooded shallow pools with sandy soils or on banks and among rocky stream beds at low altitudes. It was originally described by Martin Vahl in 1804.

== Synonyms ==
- U. affinis Wight
- U. affinis var. griffithii (Wight) Oliv. ex C.B.Clarke
- U. brachypoda Wight
- [U. caerulea Benth.]
- U. caerulea var. affinis (Wight) Thwaites
- U. cyanea R.Br.
- U. decipiens Dalzell
- U. elachista Goebel
- [U. graminifolia R.Br.]
- U. graminifolia Banks & Sol. ex Oliv.
- U. griffithii Wight
- U. intricata Griffith ex Oliv.
- U. lilacina Griffith
- U. macrophylla Masam. & Syozi
- U. nayarii Janarth.
- [U. reticulata var. stricticaulis Koenig ex Oliv.]
- U. reticulata var. uliginosa (Vahl) C.B.Clarke
- U. yakusimensis Masam.

== See also ==
- List of Utricularia species
