= Utricularia wightiana =

Scientific classification
- Kingdom: Plantae
- Clade: Tracheophytes
- Clade: Angiosperms
- Clade: Eudicots
- Clade: Asterids
- Order: Lamiales
- Family: Lentibulariaceae
- Genus: Utricularia
- Subgenus: Utricularia subg. Bivalvaria
- Section: Utricularia sect. Oligocista
- Species: U. wightiana

Binomial name
- Utricularia wightiana P.Taylor

Synonyms
- U. caerulea var. β* Oliv.; U. caerulea var. squamosa (Wight) C.B.Clarke; U. squamosa Wight

Species of carnivorous plant

Utricularia wightiana is a small to medium-sized, probably perennial carnivorous plant that belongs to the genus Utricularia. It is endemic to India and is mostly confined to Nilgiri and Kodaikanal hills of Tamil Nadu state and Attappadi hills of Kerala state of India. U. wightiana grows as a terrestrial plant in marshes and wet grasslands at altitudes from 1,000 m (3,281 ft) to 2,200 m (7,218 ft). It was originally described by Peter Taylor in 1986. It was named in honor of Robert Wight.

== See also ==
- List of Utricularia species
- ENVIS Centre - Kerala
