= Utricularia smithiana =

Scientific classification
- Kingdom: Plantae
- Clade: Tracheophytes
- Clade: Angiosperms
- Clade: Eudicots
- Clade: Asterids
- Order: Lamiales
- Family: Lentibulariaceae
- Genus: Utricularia
- Subgenus: Utricularia subg. Bivalvaria
- Section: Utricularia sect. Oligocista
- Species: U. smithiana

Binomial name
- Utricularia smithiana Wight

Synonyms
- U. caerulea Oliv.; U. caerulea var. smithiana (Wight) C.B.Clarke

Species of carnivorous plant

Utricularia smithiana is a medium-sized, probably perennial carnivorous plant that belongs to the genus Utricularia. It is endemic to India. U. smithiana grows as a terrestrial or affixed subaquatic plant in swamps or shallow water pools at medium and high altitudes. It was originally described by Robert Wight in 1849, reduced to a variety of U. caerulea by Charles Baron Clarke in 1884, and later reinstated as U. smithiana.

== See also ==
- List of Utricularia species
