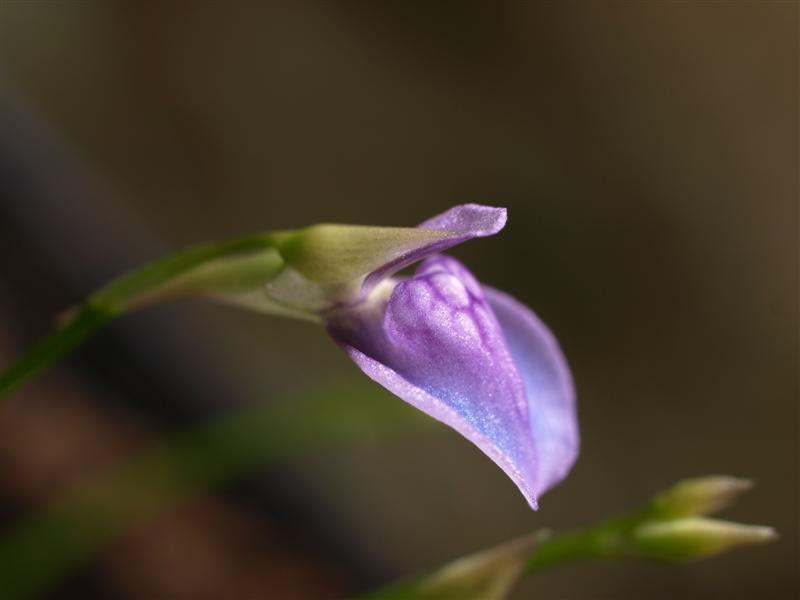

Scientific classification
- Kingdom: Plantae
- Clade: Tracheophytes
- Clade: Angiosperms
- Clade: Eudicots
- Clade: Asterids
- Order: Lamiales
- Family: Lentibulariaceae
- Genus: Utricularia
- Subgenus: Utricularia subg. Bivalvaria
- Section: Utricularia sect. Oligocista
- Species: U. babui

Binomial name
- Utricularia babui S.R.Yadav, Sardesai & S.P.Gaikwad

= Utricularia babui =

Species of carnivorous plant

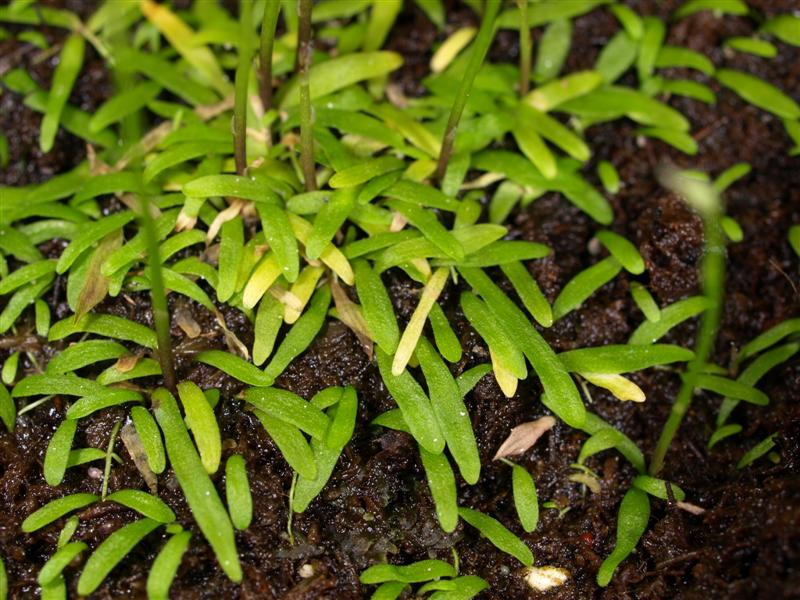
Leaves

Utricularia babui is a perennial carnivorous plant that belongs to the genus Utricularia. It is native to India and had only been collected from the Kolhapur district at the time of its description in 2005. U. babui grows as a terrestrial plant in and near small streams in open forests at altitudes from 700 m (2,297 ft) to 900 m (2,953 ft). Specimens of U. babui were previously mistaken for U. graminifolia. It was originally described and published by Shrirang Ramchandra Yadav, M. M. Sardesai, and S. P. Gaikwad in 2005.

A study of the Utricularia of Thailand published in 2010 found U. babui in Chiang Mai Province, northern Thailand. The authors found the plants at an altitude of 1,650 m (5,413 ft) on wet rock faces among mosses.

== See also ==
- List of Utricularia species
