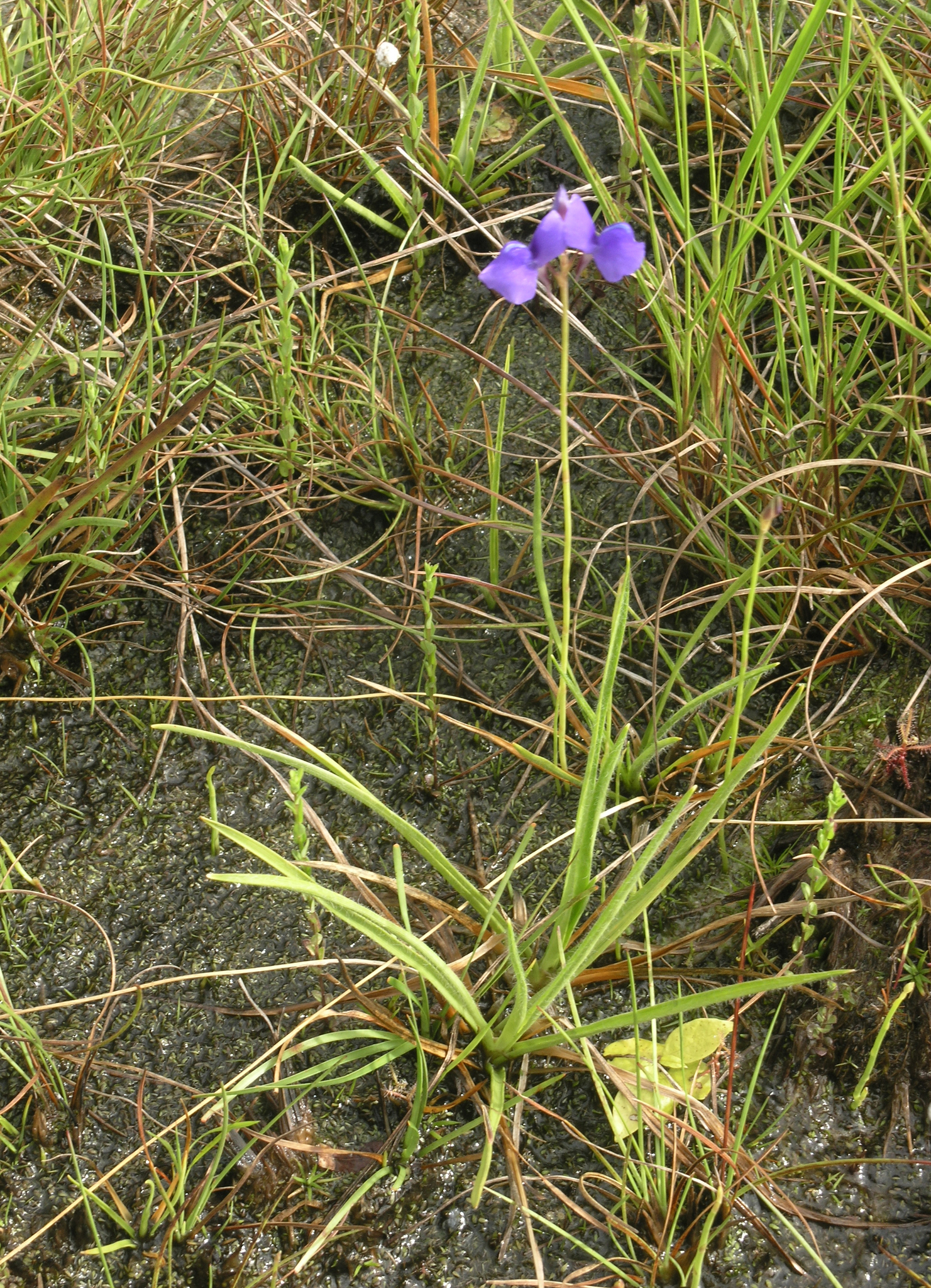

Scientific classification
- Kingdom: Plantae
- Clade: Tracheophytes
- Clade: Angiosperms
- Clade: Eudicots
- Clade: Asterids
- Order: Lamiales
- Family: Lentibulariaceae
- Genus: Utricularia
- Subgenus: Utricularia subg. Bivalvaria
- Section: Utricularia sect. Oligocista
- Species: U. delphinioides

Binomial name
- Utricularia delphinioides Thorel ex Pellegr.

Synonyms
- U. delphinioides var. minor Pellegr.

= Utricularia delphinioides =

Species of carnivorous plant

Utricularia delphinioides is a small to medium-sized, probably perennial, carnivorous plant that belongs to the genus Utricularia. It is endemic to Indochina and can be found in Cambodia, Laos, Thailand, and Vietnam. U. delphinioides grows as a terrestrial plant in swamps and rice fields, wet grasslands, or open pine forests at altitudes from near sea level to 1,300 m (4,265 ft). It was originally named by Clovis Thorel but formally described and published by François Pellegrin in 1920. A variety, U. delphinioides var. minor, was also described in 1920, but Peter Taylor reduced the variety to synonymy under U. delphinioides because he discovered a continuous range of sizes between the larger and smaller forms, size being the only distinctive characteristic in the 1920 description of the variety.

== See also ==
- List of Utricularia species
