= Utricularia polygaloides =

Scientific classification
- Kingdom: Plantae
- Clade: Tracheophytes
- Clade: Angiosperms
- Clade: Eudicots
- Clade: Asterids
- Order: Lamiales
- Family: Lentibulariaceae
- Genus: Utricularia
- Subgenus: Utricularia subg. Bivalvaria
- Section: Utricularia sect. Oligocista
- Species: U. polygaloides

Binomial name
- Utricularia polygaloides Edgew.

Synonyms
- U. caerulea var. stricticaulis Koenig; [U. humilis Herb.]; U. reticulata var. stricticaulis Koenig ex Oliv.; [U. reticulata var. uliginosa C.B.Clarke]; U. stricticaulis (Koenig ex Oliv.) Stapf ex Gamble

Species of carnivorous plant

Utricularia polygaloides is a small, probably annual carnivorous plant that belongs to the genus Utricularia. It is native to India and Sri Lanka. U. polygaloides grows as a terrestrial plant in wet soils and in cultivated fields at altitudes from around sea level to 1,000 m (3,281 ft). It was originally described by Michael Pakenham Edgeworth in 1847.

== See also ==
- List of Utricularia species
