= Utricularia bosminifera =

Scientific classification
- Kingdom: Plantae
- Clade: Tracheophytes
- Clade: Angiosperms
- Clade: Eudicots
- Clade: Asterids
- Order: Lamiales
- Family: Lentibulariaceae
- Genus: Utricularia
- Subgenus: Utricularia subg. Bivalvaria
- Section: Utricularia sect. Oligocista
- Species: U. bosminifera

Binomial name
- Utricularia bosminifera Ostenf.

Synonyms
- U. bifida var. bosminifera (Ostenf.) J.F.Maxwell

Species of carnivorous plant

Utricularia bosminifera is a small, probably perennial, carnivorous plant that belongs to the genus Utricularia. It is endemic to the Ko Chang island of Trat Province in Thailand. U. bosminifera grows as a terrestrial or subaquatic plant on sandy banks by streams. It flowers throughout the year. U. bosminifera was originally described and published by Carl Hansen Ostenfeld in 1906 and later reduced to a variety of U. bifida by J. F. Maxwell in 1985. Peter Taylor disagreed with Maxwell's taxonomic treatment and reinstated the species in his 1986 monograph. The species epithet, bosminifera, refers to the bladder traps' shape, which resembles a Bosmina, a small crustacean.

== See also ==
- List of Utricularia species
