= Utricularia heterosepala =

Scientific classification
- Kingdom: Plantae
- Clade: Tracheophytes
- Clade: Angiosperms
- Clade: Eudicots
- Clade: Asterids
- Order: Lamiales
- Family: Lentibulariaceae
- Genus: Utricularia
- Subgenus: Utricularia subg. Bivalvaria
- Section: Utricularia sect. Oligocista
- Species: U. heterosepala

Binomial name
- Utricularia heterosepala Benj.

Species of carnivorous plant

Utricularia heterosepala is a small carnivorous plant that belongs to the genus Utricularia.

Formerly regarded as endemic to the Philippines, where it can be found on the islands of Palawan, Luzon, and Sibuyan, this species is now known from the Western Ghats in India, and Hualien in Taiwan. U. heterosepala grows as a subaquatic plant in shallow water or creeks, usually at low to medium altitudes.

It was originally described and published by Ludwig Benjamin in 1847. U. heterosepala is distinct from the rest of the members in section Oligocista by apparently always lacking bracteoles.

== See also ==
- List of Utricularia species
