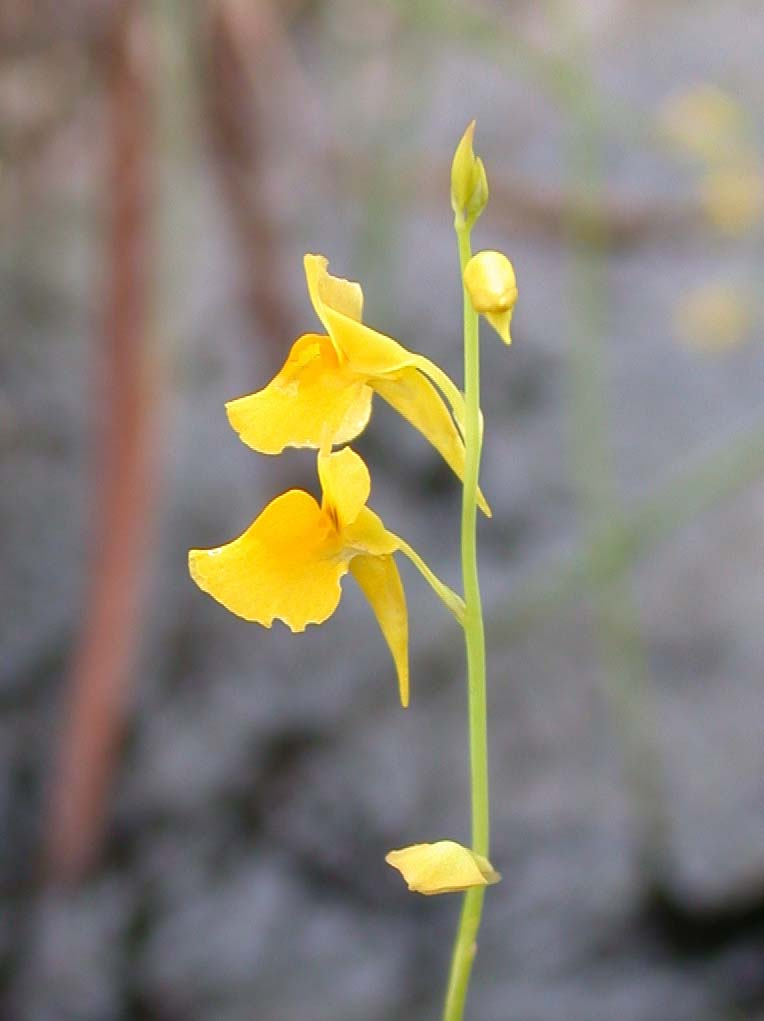

Scientific classification
- Kingdom: Plantae
- Clade: Tracheophytes
- Clade: Angiosperms
- Clade: Eudicots
- Clade: Asterids
- Order: Lamiales
- Family: Lentibulariaceae
- Genus: Utricularia
- Subgenus: Utricularia subg. Bivalvaria
- Section: Utricularia sect. Oligocista
- Species: U. odorata

Binomial name
- Utricularia odorata Pellegr.

Synonyms
- U. pterocalycina O.Schwarz; U. tortilis F.Muell.; [U. wallichiana F.Muell.]

= Utricularia odorata =

Species of carnivorous plant

Utricularia odorata is a medium-sized, probably perennial carnivorous plant that belongs to the genus Utricularia. It is native to southeastern Asia (Cambodia, Laos, Thailand, and Vietnam) and northern Australia (Northern Territory). U. odorata grows as a terrestrial plant in wet grasslands at low altitudes. It was originally described by François Pellegrin in 1920. The specific epithet odorata is derived from reports that the flowers are fragrant.

== See also ==
- List of Utricularia species
