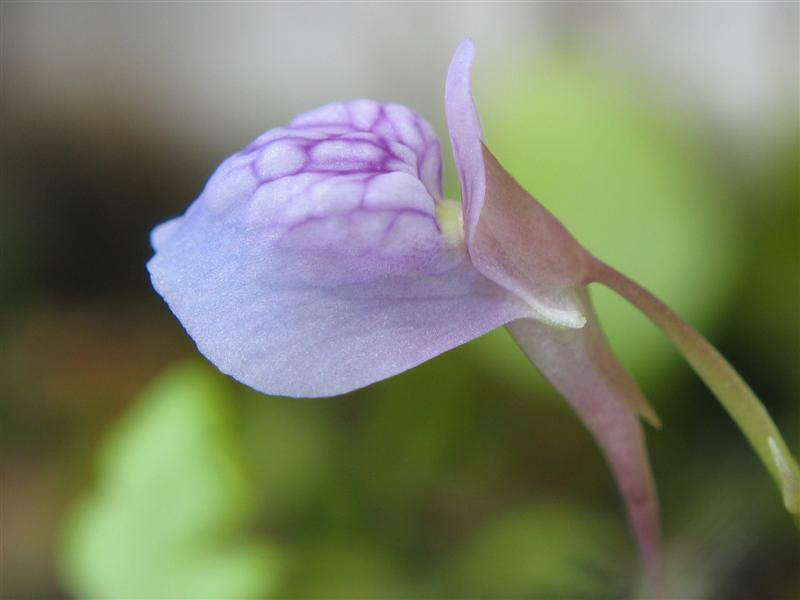

Scientific classification
- Kingdom: Plantae
- Clade: Tracheophytes
- Clade: Angiosperms
- Clade: Eudicots
- Clade: Asterids
- Order: Lamiales
- Family: Lentibulariaceae
- Genus: Utricularia
- Subgenus: Utricularia subg. Bivalvaria
- Section: Utricularia sect. Oligocista
- Species: U. graminifolia

Binomial name
- Utricularia graminifolia Vahl

Synonyms
- Utricularia acuta Benj.; Utricularia conferta Wight; Utricularia equiseticaulis Blatt. & McCann; Utricularia parviflora Buch.-Ham. ex Sm.; Utricularia pedicellata Wight; Utricularia purpurascens J.Graham; Utricularia subrecta Lace; Utricularia uliginoides Wight

= Utricularia graminifolia =

Species of carnivorous plant

Utricularia graminifolia is a small perennial carnivorous plant that belongs to the genus Utricularia. It is native to Asia, where it can be found in Burma, China, India, Sri Lanka, and Thailand. U. graminifolia grows as a terrestrial or affixed subaquatic plant in wet soils or in marshes, usually at lower altitudes but ascending to 1,500 m (4,921 ft) in Burma. It was originally described and published by Martin Vahl in 1804. It has also recently been grown in planted aquaria. It is however not a true aquatic species, as seen in species from Utricularia subg. Utricularia.

== See also ==
- List of Utricularia species
