= Utricularia letestui =

Scientific classification
- Kingdom: Plantae
- Clade: Tracheophytes
- Clade: Angiosperms
- Clade: Eudicots
- Clade: Asterids
- Order: Lamiales
- Family: Lentibulariaceae
- Genus: Utricularia
- Subgenus: Utricularia subg. Bivalvaria
- Section: Utricularia sect. Oligocista
- Species: U. letestui

Binomial name
- Utricularia letestui P.Taylor

Species of carnivorous plant

Utricularia letestui is a small, probably annual, carnivorous plant that belongs to the genus Utricularia. It is endemic to the Central African Republic and is only known from three collections. U. letestui grows as a terrestrial plant in seasonally flooded grasslands, usually at altitudes around 800 m (2,625 ft). It was originally described and published by Peter Taylor in 1989. It was named in honor of the French collector G. Le Testu.

== See also ==
- List of Utricularia species
