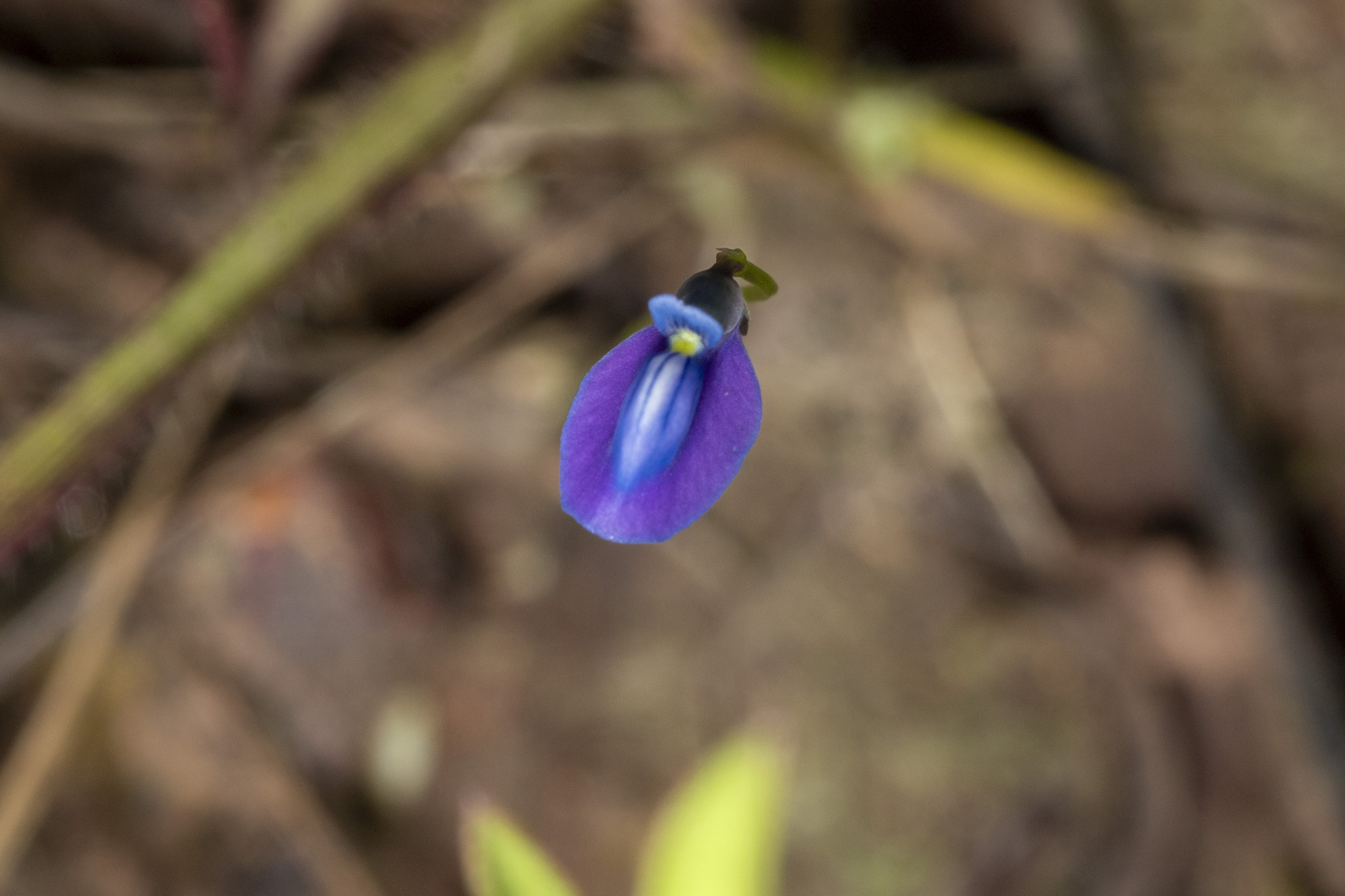

Scientific classification
- Kingdom: Plantae
- Clade: Tracheophytes
- Clade: Angiosperms
- Clade: Eudicots
- Clade: Asterids
- Order: Lamiales
- Family: Lentibulariaceae
- Genus: Utricularia
- Subgenus: Utricularia subg. Bivalvaria
- Section: Utricularia sect. Oligocista
- Species: U. praeterita

Binomial name
- Utricularia praeterita P.Taylor

Synonyms
- [U. uliginosa Santapau]

= Utricularia praeterita =

Species of carnivorous plant

Utricularia praeterita is a small annual carnivorous plant that belongs to the genus Utricularia. It is endemic to India. U. praeterita grows as a terrestrial plant in wet soils over laterite and by stream banks. It was originally described by Peter Taylor in 1983.

== See also ==
- List of Utricularia species
