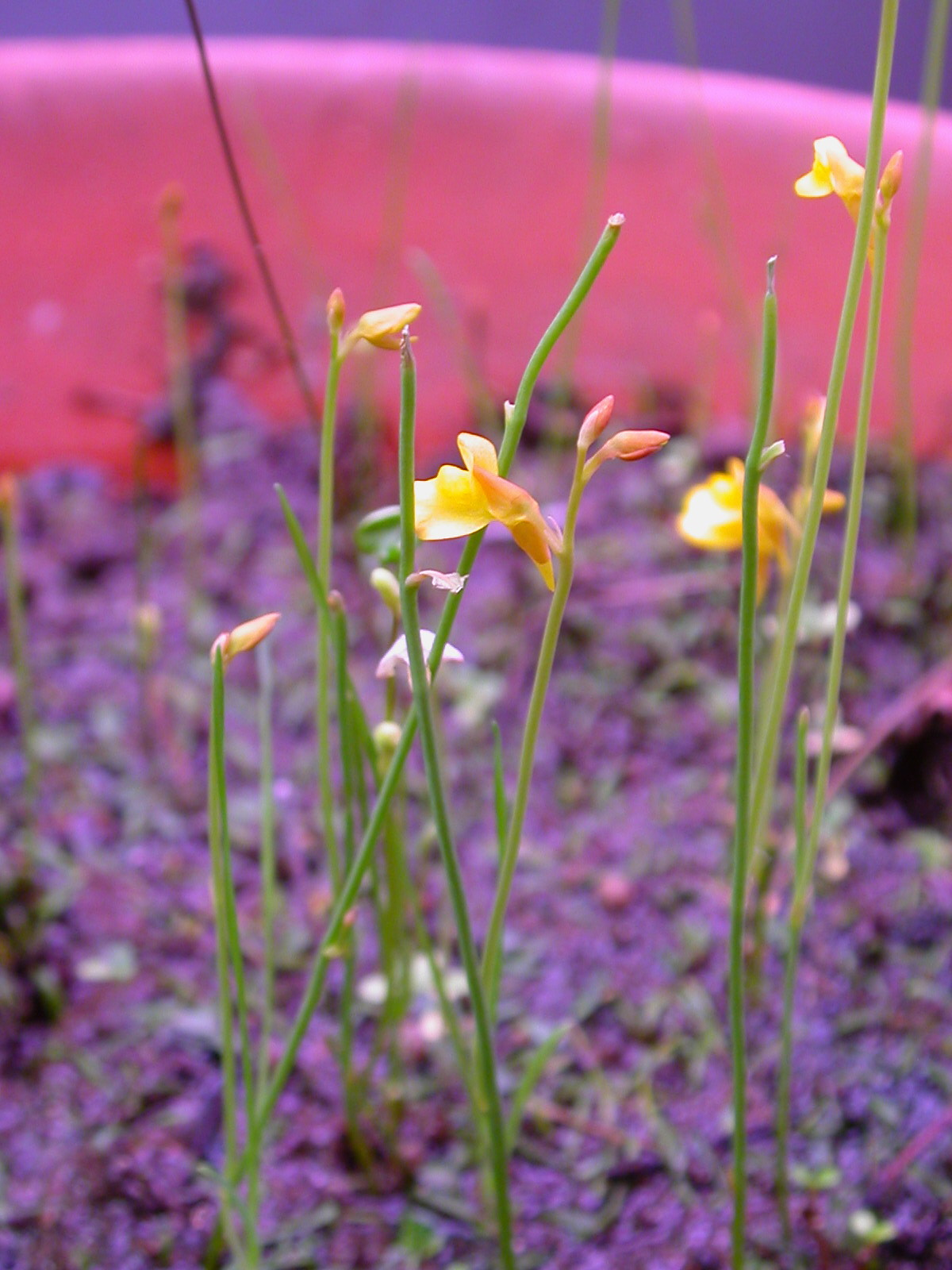

Scientific classification
- Kingdom: Plantae
- Clade: Tracheophytes
- Clade: Angiosperms
- Clade: Eudicots
- Clade: Asterids
- Order: Lamiales
- Family: Lentibulariaceae
- Genus: Utricularia
- Subgenus: Utricularia subg. Bivalvaria
- Section: Utricularia sect. Oligocista
- Species: U. bifida

Binomial name
- Utricularia bifida L.

Synonyms
- Askofake recurva (Lour.) Raf.; Nelipus bifida (L.) Raf.; Philydrum cavaleriei H.Lév.; Utricularia alata Benj.; U. antirrhinoides Wall.; U. biflora Wall.; U. biflora Hayata; U. brevicaulis Benj.; [U. diantha A.DC.]; U. humilis Vahl; U. ramosa Vahl; U. recurva Lour.; U. sumatrana Miq.; U. wallichiana Benj.

= Utricularia bifida =

Species of plant

Utricularia bifida is a small annual carnivorous plant that belongs to the genus Utricularia. It is native to Asia and Oceania and can be found in Australia, Bangladesh, Burma, Cambodia, China, Guam, India, Indonesia, Japan, Korea, Laos, Malaysia, Nepal, New Guinea, Palau, the Philippines, Sri Lanka, Thailand, and Vietnam. U. bifida grows as a terrestrial plant in damp soils and in rice fields. It was originally described and published by Carl Linnaeus in 1753.

== See also ==
- List of Utricularia species
