= Utricularia sect. Avesicarioides =

Scientific classification
- Kingdom: Plantae
- Clade: Tracheophytes
- Clade: Angiosperms
- Clade: Eudicots
- Clade: Asterids
- Order: Lamiales
- Family: Lentibulariaceae
- Genus: Utricularia
- Subgenus: Utricularia subg. Bivalvaria
- Section: Utricularia sect. Avesicarioides; Komiya

Type species
- U. rigida Benj.

Species
- Utricularia rigida; Utricularia tetraloba

Group of carnivorous plants

Utricularia sect. Avesicarioides is a section in the genus Utricularia. The two species in this section are small rheophytic carnivorous plants native to western Africa. Sadashi Komiya originally described and published this section in his 1973 taxonomic treatment of the genus. Peter Taylor revised and refined the section in his 1989 monograph on the genus.

== See also ==
- List of Utricularia species
