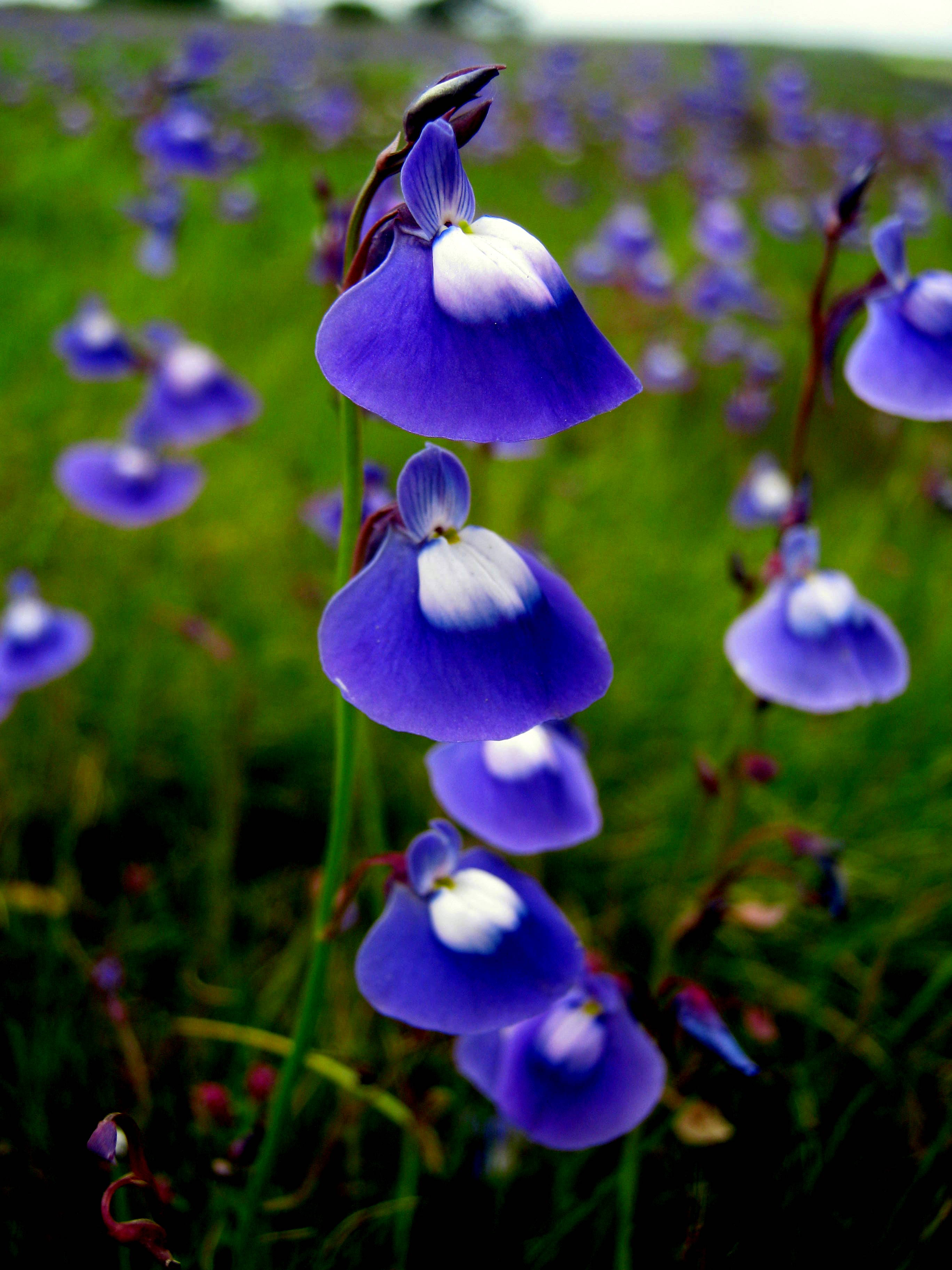

Scientific classification
- Kingdom: Plantae
- Clade: Tracheophytes
- Clade: Angiosperms
- Clade: Eudicots
- Clade: Asterids
- Order: Lamiales
- Family: Lentibulariaceae
- Genus: Utricularia
- Subgenus: Utricularia subg. Bivalvaria
- Section: Utricularia sect. Oligocista
- Species: U. arcuata

Binomial name
- Utricularia arcuata Wight

Synonyms
- U. ogmosperma Blatt. & McCann

= Utricularia arcuata =

Species of carnivorous plant

Utricularia arcuata is a small, probably annual, carnivorous plant that belongs to the genus Utricularia. It is endemic to India. U. arcuata grows as a terrestrial plant in seasonally wet depressions. It was originally described and published by Robert Wight in 1849.

== See also ==
- List of Utricularia species
