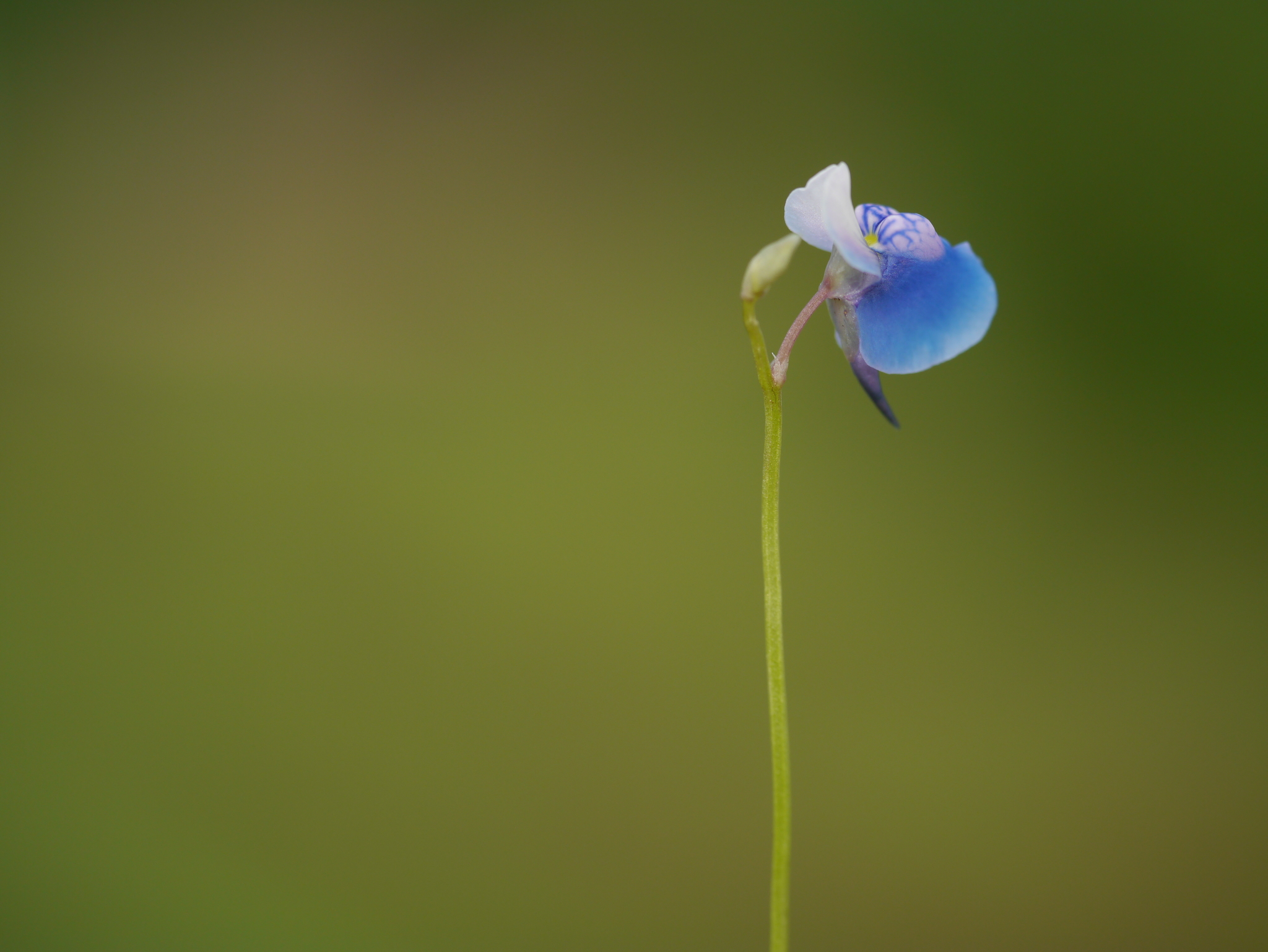

Scientific classification
- Kingdom: Plantae
- Clade: Tracheophytes
- Clade: Angiosperms
- Clade: Eudicots
- Clade: Asterids
- Order: Lamiales
- Family: Lentibulariaceae
- Genus: Utricularia
- Subgenus: Utricularia subg. Bivalvaria
- Section: Utricularia sect. Oligocista
- Species: U. albocaerulea

Binomial name
- Utricularia albocaerulea Dalzell

= Utricularia albocaerulea =

Species of carnivorous plant

Utricularia albocaerulea is a small, probably annual, carnivorous plant that belongs to the genus Utricularia. It is endemic to Maharashtra, India and is only known from a few locations in the southwestern part of this state. U. albocaerulea grows as a terrestrial plant in damp soil and on wet rocks. It was originally described and published by Nicol Alexander Dalzell in 1851.

== See also ==
- List of Utricularia species
