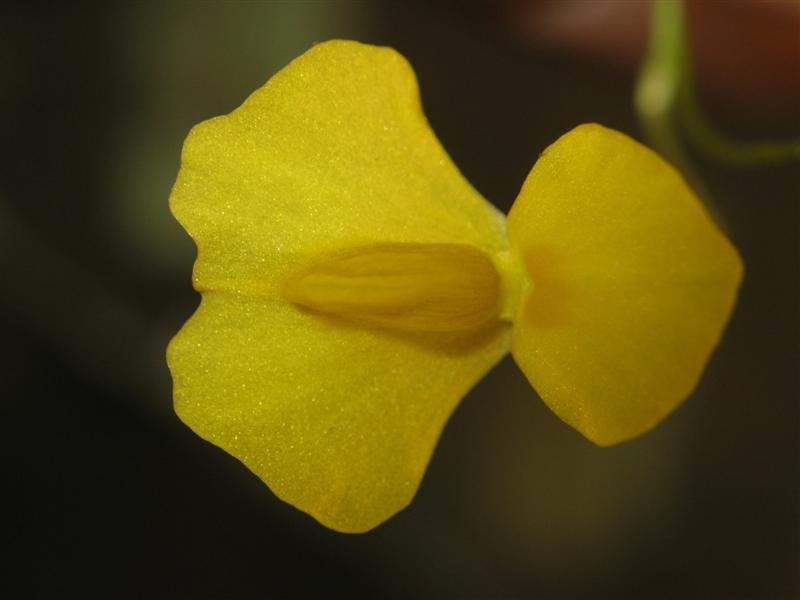

Scientific classification
- Kingdom: Plantae
- Clade: Tracheophytes
- Clade: Angiosperms
- Clade: Eudicots
- Clade: Asterids
- Order: Lamiales
- Family: Lentibulariaceae
- Genus: Utricularia
- Subgenus: Utricularia subg. Bivalvaria
- Section: Utricularia sect. Oligocista
- Species: U. involvens

Binomial name
- Utricularia involvens Ridl.

Synonyms
- U. pterocalycina O.Schwarz; U. tortilis F.Muell.; [U. wallichiana F.Muell.]

= Utricularia involvens =

Species of carnivorous plant

Utricularia involvens is a medium-sized, probably perennial, carnivorous plant that belongs to the genus Utricularia. It grows naturally in southeastern Asia (Burma, Peninsular Malaysia, Thailand) and northern Australia. U. involvens grows as a terrestrial plant in wet grasslands or open vegetation, usually at low altitudes but ascending to 900 m (2,953 ft) in Malaysia. It was originally described and published by Henry Nicholas Ridley in 1895.

== See also ==
- List of Utricularia species
