= Utricularia lloydii =

Scientific classification
- Kingdom: Plantae
- Clade: Embryophytes
- Clade: Tracheophytes
- Clade: Angiosperms
- Clade: Eudicots
- Clade: Asterids
- Order: Lamiales
- Family: Lentibulariaceae
- Genus: Utricularia
- Subgenus: Utricularia subg. Bivalvaria
- Section: Utricularia sect. Oligocista
- Species: U. lloydii

Binomial name
- Utricularia lloydii Merl ex F.E.Lloyd

Species of carnivorous plant

Utricularia lloydii is a small or very small annual carnivorous plant that belongs to the genus Utricularia. It is endemic to Central and South America and is widespread but known from few collections in Bolivia, Brazil, Panama, Suriname, Venezuela. U. lloydii grows as a terrestrial plant in wet sandy soils in savannas at altitudes from sea level to around 600 m (1,969 ft). It was originally named by E. M. Merl and formally described and published by Francis Ernest Lloyd in 1932. Merl named it in honor of Lloyd.

== See also ==
- List of Utricularia species
