= Utricularia subramanyamii =

Scientific classification
- Kingdom: Plantae
- Clade: Tracheophytes
- Clade: Angiosperms
- Clade: Eudicots
- Clade: Asterids
- Order: Lamiales
- Family: Lentibulariaceae
- Genus: Utricularia
- Subgenus: Utricularia subg. Bivalvaria
- Section: Utricularia sect. Oligocista
- Species: U. subramanyamii

Binomial name
- Utricularia subramanyamii Janarth. & A.N.Henry

Species of carnivorous plant

Utricularia subramanyamii is a terrestrial carnivorous plant that belongs to the genus Utricularia. It is endemic to the Pathanamthitta district in southern India. U. subramanyamii grows in marshy areas. It was originally collected by C. N. Mohanan in 1978 and was formally described by M. K. Janarthanam and Ambrose Nathaniel Henry in 1990 as Utricularia subramanii, later corrected to its current form. The species epithet honors Dr. K. Subramanyam, who was the director of the Botanical Survey of India.

== See also ==
- List of Utricularia species
