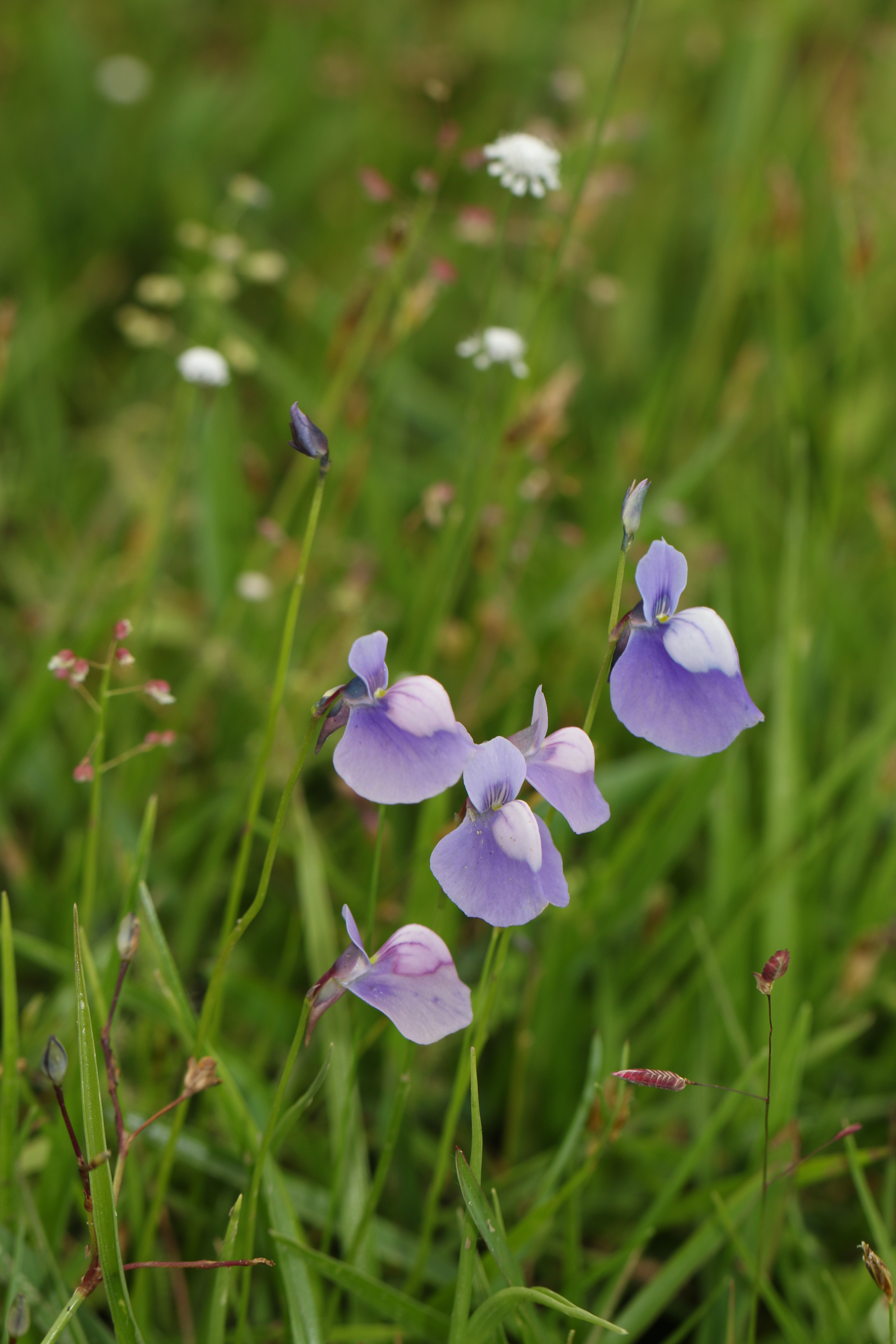

Conservation status
- Endangered (IUCN 3.1)

Scientific classification
- Kingdom: Plantae
- Clade: Tracheophytes
- Clade: Angiosperms
- Clade: Eudicots
- Clade: Asterids
- Order: Lamiales
- Family: Lentibulariaceae
- Genus: Utricularia
- Subgenus: Utricularia subg. Bivalvaria
- Section: Utricularia sect. Oligocista
- Species: U. cecilii

Binomial name
- Utricularia cecilii P.Taylor

= Utricularia cecilii =

Species of plant

Utricularia cecilii is a small annual carnivorous plant that belongs to the genus Utricularia. It is endemic to an area around Mangalore in Karnataka state and is only known from the type location and one other collection from the same region. U. cecilii grows as a terrestrial plant in damp, shallow soils over laterite. It flowers in August and September. U. cecilii was originally described and published by Peter Taylor in 1984. This species is named in honor of Father Cecil Saldanha S.J., who had shown Taylor this species in 1981.

== See also ==
- List of Utricularia species
