= Utricularia vitellina =

Scientific classification
- Kingdom: Plantae
- Clade: Tracheophytes
- Clade: Angiosperms
- Clade: Eudicots
- Clade: Asterids
- Order: Lamiales
- Family: Lentibulariaceae
- Genus: Utricularia
- Subgenus: Utricularia subg. Bivalvaria
- Section: Utricularia sect. Oligocista
- Species: U. vitellina

Binomial name
- Utricularia vitellina Ridl.

Synonyms
- U. aurea Ridl.

Species of carnivorous plant

Utricularia vitellina is a small or very small, probably perennial carnivorous plant that belongs to the genus Utricularia. It is endemic to Peninsular Malaysia and is only known from two mountain peaks (Gunung Tahan and Gunung Kerbau) that are over 100 km (62.1 mi) apart. U. vitellina grows as a terrestrial plant in peaty stream banks among bryophytes at altitudes from 1,500 m (4,921 ft) to 2,100 m (6,890 ft). It was originally described by Henry Nicholas Ridley in 1923. It is distinct from the rest of the species in section Oligocista by not having a basal swelling of the lower corolla lip.

== See also ==
- List of Utricularia species
