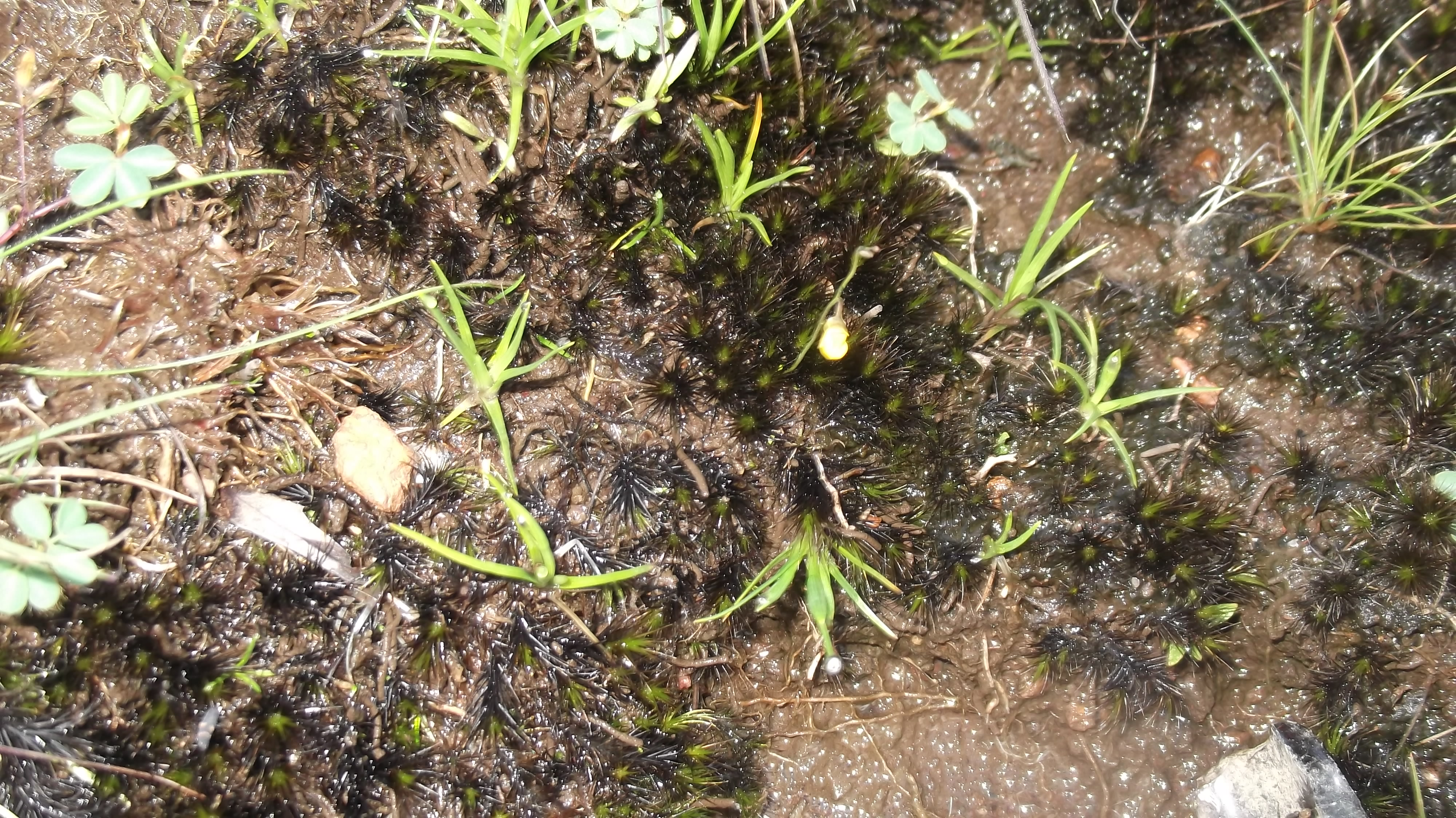
- Insectiveorus plant-rhizomatus herb, moist soil by exposed rocks, flowers yellow.

Scientific classification
- Kingdom: Plantae
- Clade: Tracheophytes
- Clade: Angiosperms
- Clade: Eudicots
- Clade: Asterids
- Order: Lamiales
- Family: Lentibulariaceae
- Genus: Utricularia
- Subgenus: Utricularia subg. Bivalvaria
- Section: Utricularia sect. Oligocista
- Species: U. scandens

Binomial name
- Utricularia scandens Benj.

= Utricularia scandens =

Species of carnivorous plant

Utricularia scandens is a small, probably annual carnivorous plant that belongs to the genus Utricularia. It has a wide native distribution that includes Africa (Angola, Cameroon, the Central African Republic, Côte d'Ivoire, the Democratic Republic of the Congo, Ethiopia, Guinea, Madagascar, Malawi, Mozambique, Nigeria, South Africa, Sudan, Tanzania, Zambia, and Zimbabwe) and Asia (Bangladesh, Burma, China, India, Indonesia, Malaysia, Nepal, Sri Lanka, Thailand, and Vietnam). U. scandens grows as a terrestrial plant in wet grasslands and bogs at lower altitudes around sea level up to 2,300 m (7,546 ft). It was originally described by Ludwig Benjamin in 1847. There is a significant amount of synonymy established for this species, in part because of its large distribution and variable morphology.

== Synonyms ==
- Polypompholyx madecassa H.Perrier
- Utricularia bifida var. wallichiana (Wight) Thwaites
- U. gibbsiae Stapf
- U. macrolepis Wight
- [U. micropetala Hutch. & Dalziel]
- [U. prehensilis Pellegr.]
- U. scandens subsp. scandens P.Taylor
- U. scandens var. scandens P.Taylor
- U. scandens subsp. schweinfurthii (Baker ex Stapf) P.Taylor
- U. schweinfurthii Baker ex Stapf
- U. wallichiana Wight
- U. wallichii Wight
- U. volubilis Wight

== See also ==
- List of Utricularia species
