= Letestudoxa bella =

Scientific classification
- Kingdom: Plantae
- Clade: Embryophytes
- Clade: Tracheophytes
- Clade: Angiosperms
- Clade: Magnoliids
- Order: Magnoliales
- Family: Annonaceae
- Genus: Letestudoxa
- Species: L. bella

Binomial name
- Letestudoxa bella Pellegr.

Synonyms
- Letestudoxa grandifolia Pellegr.; Pachypodanthium simiarum Exell & Mendonça

Species of flowering plant

Letestudoxa bella is a liana in the Annonaceae family. It grows in west central tropical Africa.
