= Utricularia capillacea =

Scientific classification
- Kingdom: Plantae
- Clade: Tracheophytes
- Clade: Angiosperms
- Clade: Eudicots
- Clade: Asterids
- Order: Lamiales
- Family: Lentibulariaceae
- Genus: Utricularia
- Species: U. capillacea

Binomial name
- Utricularia capillacea Willd.

Synonyms
- Utricularia wallichii Wight; Utricularia wallichiana var. scandens (Benj.) Pellegr.; Utricularia wallichiana var. macrolepis (R. Wight) Gamble; Utricularia wallichiana R. Wight; Utricularia schweinfurthii Baker; Utricularia scandens subsp. schweinfurthii (Baker ex Stapf) P. Taylor; Utricularia scandens Benj.; Utricularia macrolepis Wight; Utricularia gibbsiae Stapf; Utricularia bifida var. wallichiana (R. Wight) Thw.; Polypompholyx madecassa H. Perrier

Species of carnivorous plant

Utricularia capillacea is a species of carnivorous plant from the Lentibulariaceae family, Lamiales order, described by Carl Ludwig Willdenow. According to the Catalogue of Life Utricularia capillacea does not have known subspecies.
