= Letestudoxa =

Scientific classification
- Kingdom: Plantae
- Clade: Tracheophytes
- Clade: Angiosperms
- Clade: Magnoliids
- Order: Magnoliales
- Family: Annonaceae
- Genus: Letestudoxa; Pellegr.

Genus of plants

Letestudoxa is a genus of flowering plants belonging to the family Annonaceae.

Its native range is western Central Tropical Africa. It is found in Cabinda (region in Angola), Cameroon, Congo and Gabon.

The genus name of Letestudoxa is in honour of Georges Marie Patrice Charles Le Testu (1877–1967), a French colonial administrator in tropical Africa and was later at a botanical garden in Caen. It was first described and published in Bull. Mus. Natl. Hist. Nat. Vol.26 on page 654 in 1920.

== Known species ==
According to Kew:

- Letestudoxa bella Pellegr.
- Letestudoxa glabrifolia Chatrou & Repetur
- Letestudoxa lanuginosa Le Thomas
