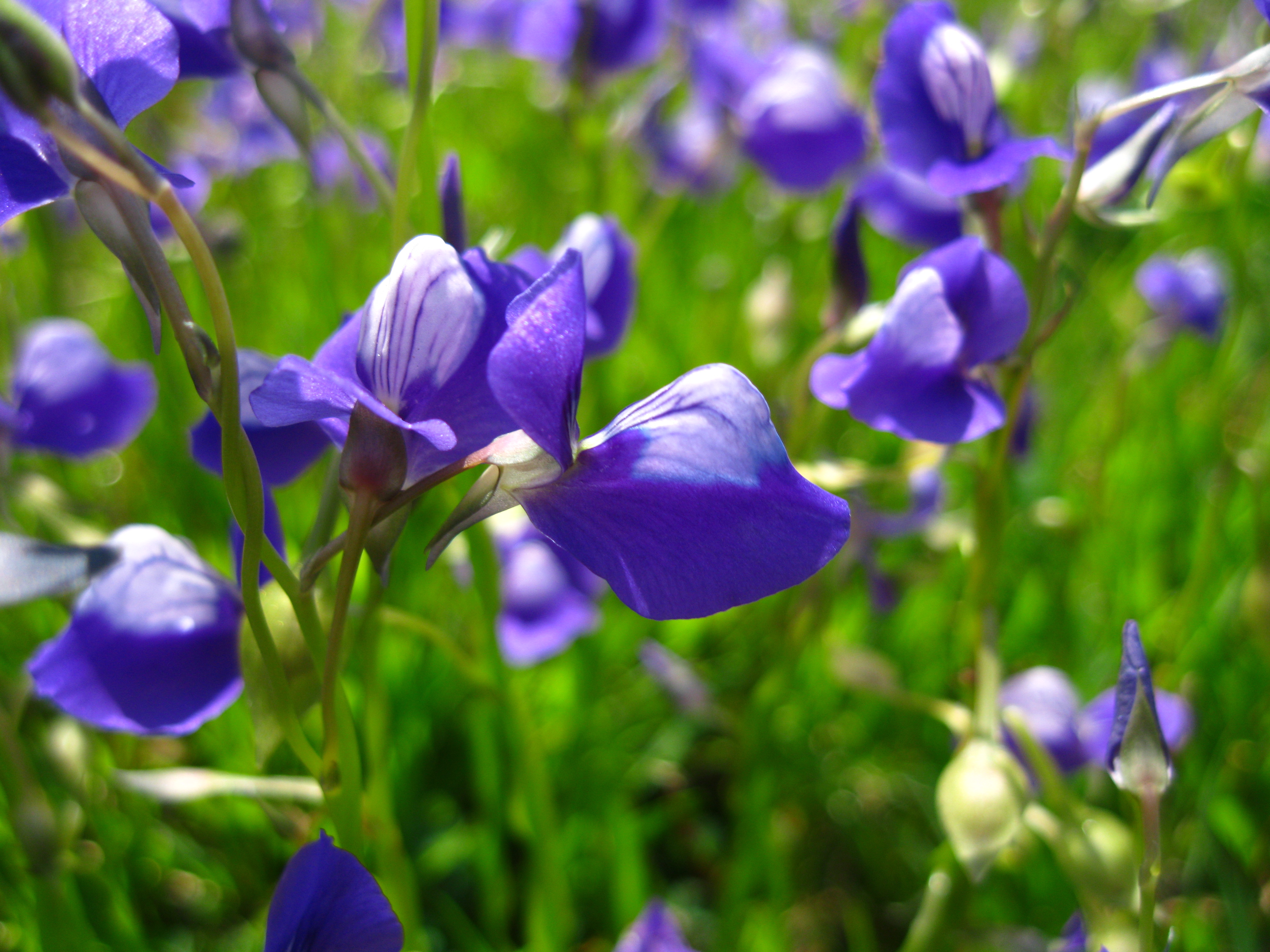
- Flower and stem

Scientific classification
- Kingdom: Plantae
- Clade: Tracheophytes
- Clade: Angiosperms
- Clade: Eudicots
- Clade: Asterids
- Order: Lamiales
- Family: Lentibulariaceae
- Genus: Utricularia
- Subgenus: Utricularia subg. Bivalvaria
- Section: Utricularia sect. Oligocista
- Species: U. reticulata

Binomial name
- Utricularia reticulata Sm.

Synonyms
- [U. caerulea var. caerulea Bhattacharyya]; [U. graminifolia Graham]; U. oryzetorum Miq.; U. reticulata var. parviflora Santapau; U. spiricaulis Miq.

= Utricularia reticulata =

Species of carnivorous plant

Utricularia reticulata, also known as net-veined bladderwort, is a medium to large-sized, probably annual carnivorous plant that belongs to the genus Utricularia. It is native to India and Sri Lanka. U. reticulata grows as a terrestrial or subaquatic plant in marshy grasslands or wet soils over rocks at lower altitudes up to 750 m (2,461 ft). It is also a common weed found in rice fields. U. reticulata was originally described by James Edward Smith in 1808, but he did not cite a specimen and instead referred to a botanical print in Hendrik van Rheede's 1689 Hortus Malabaricus.

== Description ==
The leaves are narrowly linear-oblong and about 1-2 cm long. The slender scapes are about 15 cm to 50 cm long, erect and twinned. Flowers are bluish purple in colour, arranged in racemes, well-spaced in the upper part of the raceme, with 6-12 mm long peduncles. Flowers are 2-lipped with the 1.2-1.6 cm long larger lip, darkly net-veined, with a light colored center. They each have a conical, straight spur about 6 mm long.

== Distribution ==
India and Sri Lanka.

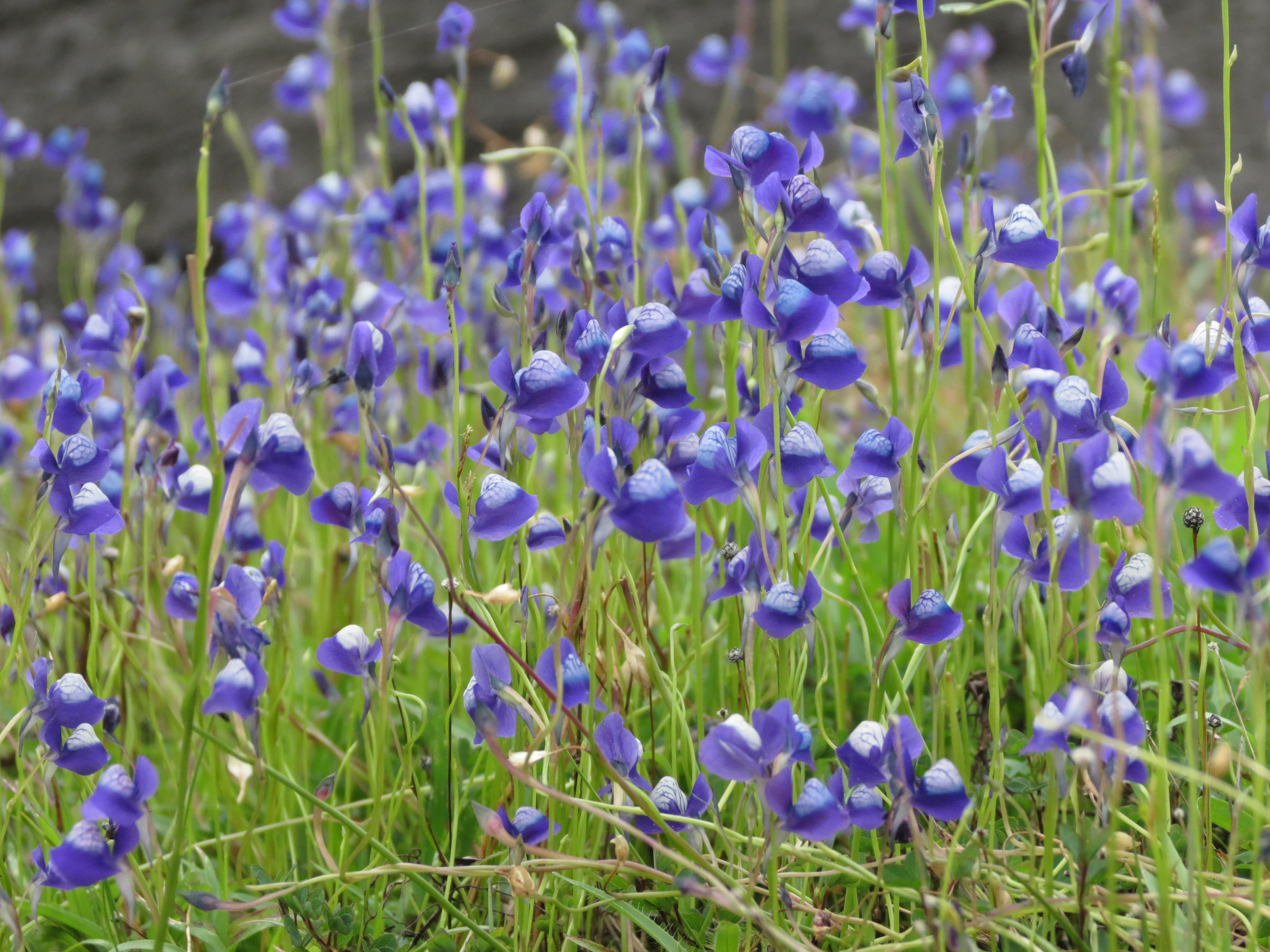

== See also ==
- List of Utricularia species
