= Utricularia micropetala =

Scientific classification
- Kingdom: Plantae
- Clade: Tracheophytes
- Clade: Angiosperms
- Clade: Eudicots
- Clade: Asterids
- Order: Lamiales
- Family: Lentibulariaceae
- Genus: Utricularia
- Subgenus: Utricularia subg. Bivalvaria
- Section: Utricularia sect. Oligocista
- Species: U. micropetala

Binomial name
- Utricularia micropetala Sm.

Synonyms
- U. cucullata Afzel. Kamieński; U. inflata Afzel. Kamieński; U. micropetala var. micropetala P.Taylor

Species of carnivorous plant

Utricularia micropetala is a small annual carnivorous plant that belongs to the genus Utricularia. It is endemic to western tropical Africa and is found in the Central African Republic, Guinea, Nigeria, and Sierra Leone. U. micropetala grows as a terrestrial plant among wet rocks at altitudes up to 1,500 m (4,921 ft). It was originally described by James Edward Smith in 1819. It can be distinguished from all other species in section Oligocista by the large and inflated spur and very short lower corolla lip.

== See also ==
- List of Utricularia species
