= Utricularia meyeri =

Scientific classification
- Kingdom: Plantae
- Clade: Tracheophytes
- Clade: Angiosperms
- Clade: Eudicots
- Clade: Asterids
- Order: Lamiales
- Family: Lentibulariaceae
- Genus: Utricularia
- Subgenus: Utricularia subg. Bivalvaria
- Section: Utricularia sect. Oligocista
- Species: U. meyeri

Binomial name
- Utricularia meyeri Pilg.

Synonyms
- [U. erectiflora P.Taylor]

Species of carnivorous plant

Utricularia meyeri is a medium-sized, probably perennial carnivorous plant that belongs to the genus Utricularia. It is endemic to western Goias and eastern Mato Grosso in central Brazil. U. meyeri grows as a terrestrial plant in bogs and seasonally flooded swamps and grasslands at altitudes from 400 m (1,312 ft) to around 600 m (1,969 ft). It was originally described by Robert Knud Friedrich Pilger in 1901 and later reduced to synonymy under U. erectiflora by Peter Taylor in 1967. He later reevaluated his decision on the basis of scanning electron microscope images of the seed of the two species.

== See also ==
- List of Utricularia species
