= Utricularia prehensilis =

Scientific classification
- Kingdom: Plantae
- Clade: Tracheophytes
- Clade: Angiosperms
- Clade: Eudicots
- Clade: Asterids
- Order: Lamiales
- Family: Lentibulariaceae
- Genus: Utricularia
- Subgenus: Utricularia subg. Bivalvaria
- Section: Utricularia sect. Oligocista
- Species: U. prehensilis

Binomial name
- Utricularia prehensilis E.Mey.

Synonyms
- U. bifida Bojer ex A.DC.; U. hians A.DC.; U. huillensis Welw. ex Kamieński; U. lingulata Baker; U. prehensilis var. hians (A.DC.) Kamieński; U. prehensilis var. huillensis Kamieński; U. prehensilis var. lingulata (Baker) Kamieński; U. quadricarinata Suess.

Species of carnivorous plant

Utricularia prehensilis is a small to medium-sized, probably perennial carnivorous plant that belongs to the genus Utricularia. It is native to tropical and southern Africa, where it can be found in Angola, the Central African Republic, the Democratic Republic of the Congo, Ethiopia, Kenya, Madagascar, South Africa, Eswatini, Tanzania, Zambia, and Zimbabwe. U. prehensilis grows as a terrestrial plant in marshes, bogs, and swamps from altitudes around sea level near its southern range up to 2,100 m (6,890 ft) in southern Tanzania. It was originally described by Ernst Heinrich Friedrich Meyer in 1837.

== See also ==
- List of Utricularia species
