= Utricularia jackii =

Scientific classification
- Kingdom: Plantae
- Clade: Tracheophytes
- Clade: Angiosperms
- Clade: Eudicots
- Clade: Asterids
- Order: Lamiales
- Family: Lentibulariaceae
- Genus: Utricularia
- Subgenus: Utricularia subg. Bivalvaria
- Section: Utricularia sect. Oligocista
- Species: U. jackii

Binomial name
- Utricularia jackii J.Parn.

Species of carnivorous plant

Utricularia jackii is a terrestrial carnivorous plant that belongs to the genus Utricularia. It is endemic to Thailand. U. jackii grows among wet rocks at higher altitudes (around 2,200 m (7,218 ft)) or sometimes in evergreen forests. It was first collected in 1927 and again in 1958. In his 1989 revision of his monograph, Peter Taylor discussed the specimen and identified it as potentially distinct, but never formally described it. John Adrian Naicker Parnell located the herbarium specimens in preparation for a review of Lentibulariaceae of Thailand and formally described it as a new species in 2005. Parnell named it in honor of his father, John "Jack" Thomas Mackie Parnell.

== See also ==
- List of Utricularia species
