= Utricularia tetraloba =

Conservation status
- Vulnerable (IUCN 3.1)

Scientific classification
- Kingdom: Plantae
- Clade: Tracheophytes
- Clade: Angiosperms
- Clade: Eudicots
- Clade: Asterids
- Order: Lamiales
- Family: Lentibulariaceae
- Genus: Utricularia
- Subgenus: Utricularia subg. Bivalvaria
- Section: Utricularia sect. Avesicarioides
- Species: U. tetraloba

Binomial name
- Utricularia tetraloba P.Taylor

Species of carnivorous plant

Utricularia tetraloba is a very small, probably perennial, rheophytic carnivorous plant that belongs to the genus Utricularia. U. tetraloba is endemic to Guinea and Sierra Leone. It grows as a rheophyte on rocks in shallow running water at altitudes from 360 m (1,181 ft) to 690 m (2,264 ft). It was originally described and published by Peter Taylor in 1963. It is distinguished from the other species in the section, U. rigida, by having four lower lip corolla lobes as opposed to U. rigida's two.

== See also ==
- List of Utricularia species
