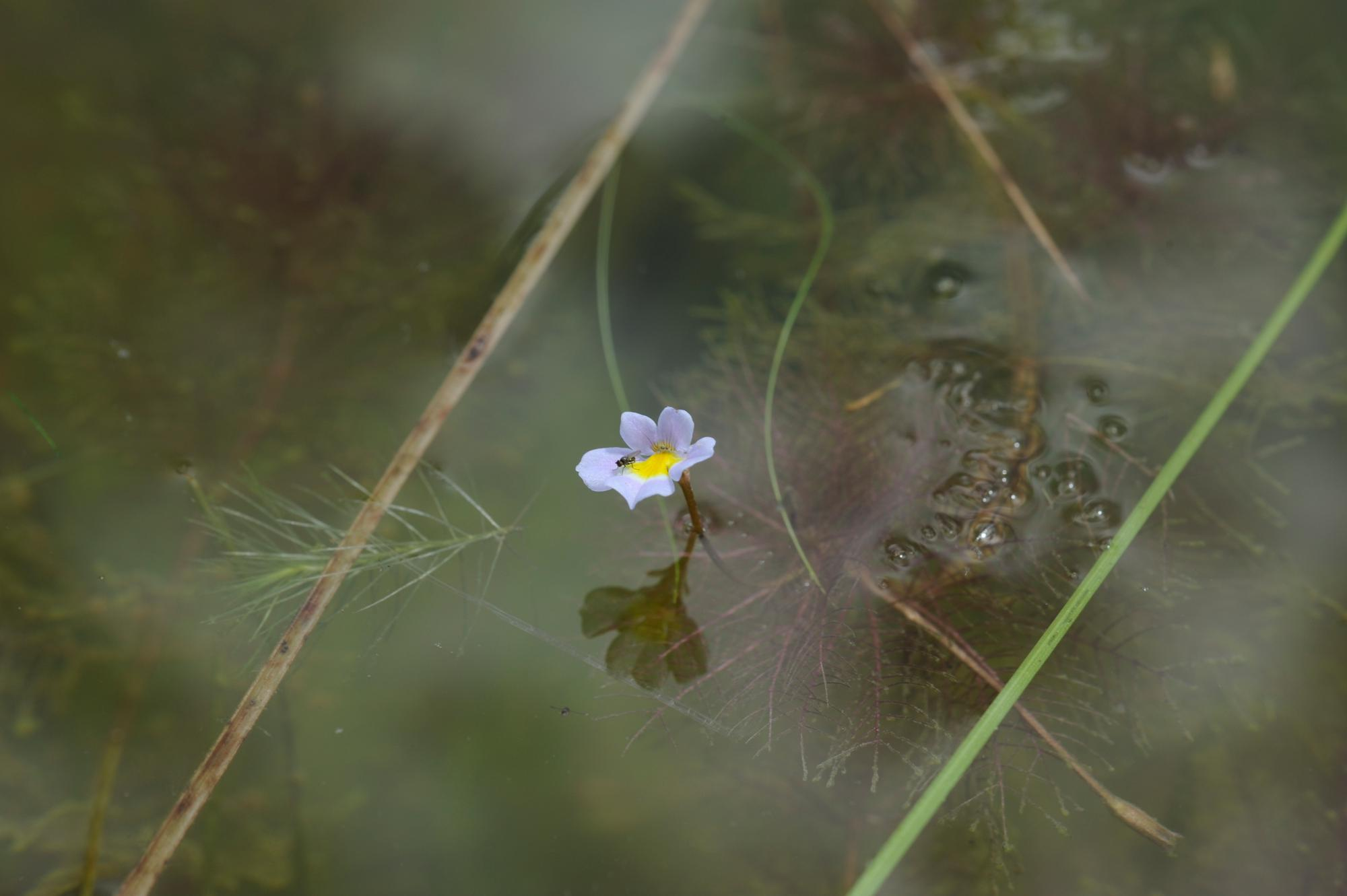

Scientific classification
- Kingdom: Plantae
- Clade: Tracheophytes
- Clade: Angiosperms
- Clade: Eudicots
- Clade: Asterids
- Order: Lamiales
- Family: Plantaginaceae
- Genus: Benjaminia; Mart. ex Benj.
- Species: B. reflexa

Binomial name
- Benjaminia reflexa (Benth.) D'Arcy

Synonyms
- Bacopa naias Standl.; Bacopa reflexa (Benth.) Loefgr. & Edwall; Benjaminia utriculariiformis Mart. ex Benj.; Herpestis reflexa Benth.; Limnophila costaricensis Suess.; Limnophila costaricensis f. aquatica Suess.; Limnophila costaricensis f. semiterrestris Suess.; Moniera reflexa (Benth.) Kuntze; Naiadothrix reflexa (Benth.) Pennell; Quinquelobus utriculariiformis Benj.; Quinquelobus utricularioides Benj.

= Benjaminia reflexa =

Species of flowering plant

Benjaminia is a monotypic genus of flowering plants belonging to the family Plantaginaceae. It only contains one known species, Benjaminia reflexa (Benth.) D'Arcy.

Its native range is parts of Central and Tropical America, and is found in Belize, Bolivia, Brazil, Colombia, Costa Rica, Cuba, French Guiana, Guatemala, Guyana, Honduras, Mexico Gulf, southeastern Mexico, Nicaragua, Panamá, Suriname, Trinidad and Tobago and Venezuela.

It is an aquatic species from freshwater marshes, and coastal lagoons and freshwater lagoons.

The genus name of Benjaminia is in honour of Ludwig Benjamin (1825–48) was a German botanist who contributed to Carl Friedrich Philipp von Martius' Flora Brasiliensis. The Latin specific epithet of reflexa is derived from reflecto meaning "bent backwards" or "reflexed". The genus was first described and published in C.F.P.von Martius & auct. suc. (eds.), Fl. Bras. Vol.10 on page 255 in 1847. The species was then published in Ann. Missouri Bot. Gard. Vol.66 on page 194 in 1979.

The genus is recognized by the United States Department of Agriculture and the Agricultural Research Service, but they do not list any known species.
