= Utricularia lazulina =

Scientific classification
- Kingdom: Plantae
- Clade: Tracheophytes
- Clade: Angiosperms
- Clade: Eudicots
- Clade: Asterids
- Order: Lamiales
- Family: Lentibulariaceae
- Genus: Utricularia
- Subgenus: Utricularia subg. Bivalvaria
- Section: Utricularia sect. Oligocista
- Species: U. lazulina

Binomial name
- Utricularia lazulina P.Taylor

Species of carnivorous plant

Utricularia lazulina is a small annual carnivorous plant that belongs to the genus Utricularia. It is endemic to an area around Mangalore, India. U. lazulina grows as a terrestrial plant in shallow wet soils over laterite or in wet grasslands. It was originally described and published by Peter Taylor in 1984.

== See also ==
- List of Utricularia species
