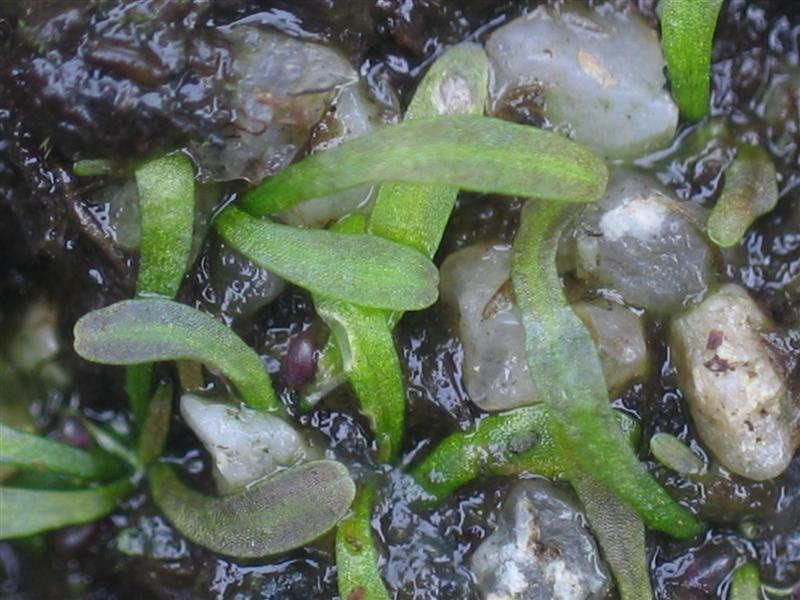

Scientific classification
- Kingdom: Plantae
- Clade: Tracheophytes
- Clade: Angiosperms
- Clade: Eudicots
- Clade: Asterids
- Order: Lamiales
- Family: Lentibulariaceae
- Genus: Utricularia
- Subgenus: Utricularia subg. Bivalvaria
- Section: Utricularia sect. Benjaminia
- Species: U. nana

Binomial name
- Utricularia nana A. St. Hil. & Girard, 1838

= Utricularia nana =

Species of carnivorous plant

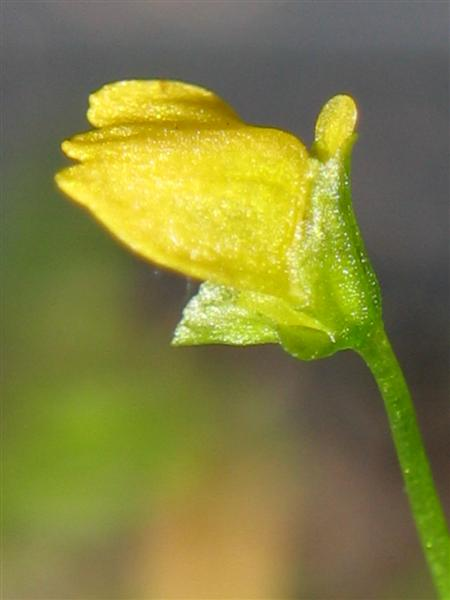

Utricularia nana is a carnivorous plant of the Lentibulariaceae family and is the only species in the section Benjaminia.

== Distribution ==
It is native to the South American countries of Venezuela, Guyana, Suriname, French Guinea, Brazil and Paraguay. It grows in swampy ground by streams and wet sandy savanna, from sea level to 1,250 m. The plant flowers between January and June.

== Description ==
It is a small plant, with few filiform rhizoids, which bear numerous short papillose branches. Corolla yellow.
