= Utricularia erectiflora =

Scientific classification
- Kingdom: Plantae
- Clade: Embryophytes
- Clade: Tracheophytes
- Clade: Angiosperms
- Clade: Eudicots
- Clade: Asterids
- Order: Lamiales
- Family: Lentibulariaceae
- Genus: Utricularia
- Subgenus: Utricularia subg. Bivalvaria
- Section: Utricularia sect. Oligocista
- Species: U. erectiflora

Binomial name
- Utricularia erectiflora A.St.-Hil. & Girard

Synonyms
- Stomoisia spicata (Sylvén) Gleason; U. cearana Steyerm.; U. dicardia Standl.; [U. juncea Standl.]; U. micrantha Benj.; U. spicata Sylvén

Species of carnivorous plant

Utricularia erectiflora is a small, probably perennial, carnivorous plant that belongs to the genus Utricularia. It is native to Central and South America and can be found in Belize, Bolivia, Brazil, Colombia, Ecuador, Guyana, Nicaragua, Suriname, and Venezuela. U. erectiflora grows as a terrestrial plant in wet, sandy savannas, wet grasslands, or marshes. It was originally described and published by Augustin Saint-Hilaire, and Frédéric de Girard in 1838.

== See also ==
- List of Utricularia species
