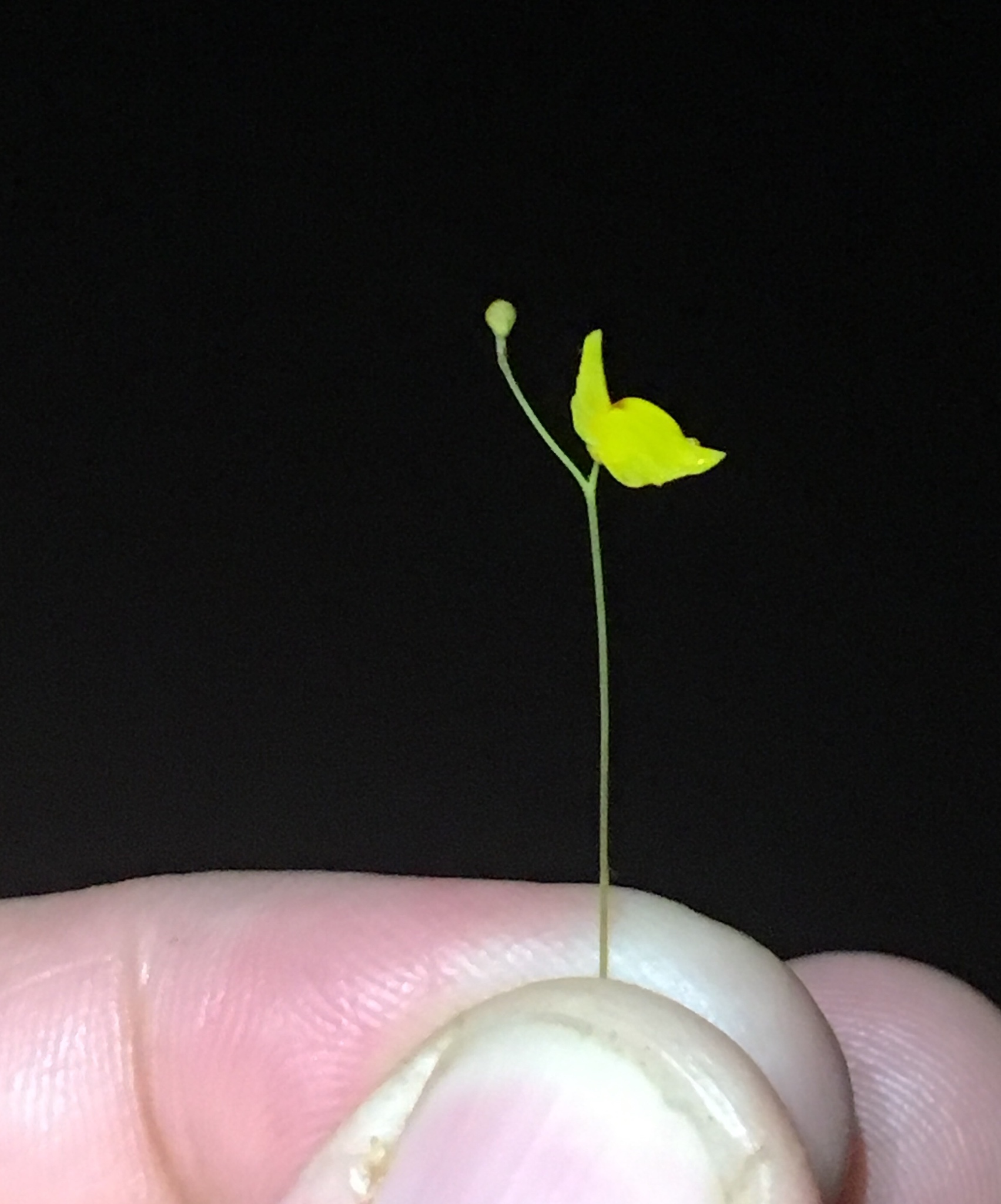

Scientific classification
- Kingdom: Plantae
- Clade: Embryophytes
- Clade: Tracheophytes
- Clade: Angiosperms
- Clade: Eudicots
- Clade: Asterids
- Order: Lamiales
- Family: Lentibulariaceae
- Genus: Utricularia
- Subgenus: Utricularia subg. Bivalvaria
- Section: Utricularia sect. Oligocista
- Species: U. chiribiquitensis

Binomial name
- Utricularia chiribiquitensis A.Fernández

Synonyms
- [U. adpressa A.Fernández]; [U. laxa Steyerm.]

= Utricularia chiribiquitensis =

Species of carnivorous plant

Utricularia chiribiquitensis is a small, probably annual, carnivorous plant that belongs to the genus Utricularia. It is endemic to Colombia and Venezuela. U. chiribiquitensis grows as a terrestrial plant in wet, sandy savannas or marshes at altitudes from 80 m (262 ft) to 1,800 m (5,906 ft). It was originally described and published by Alvaro Fernández-Pérez in 1964. The species epithet, chiribiquitensis, refers to the mountain range in Colombia where this species is found.

== See also ==
- List of Utricularia species
