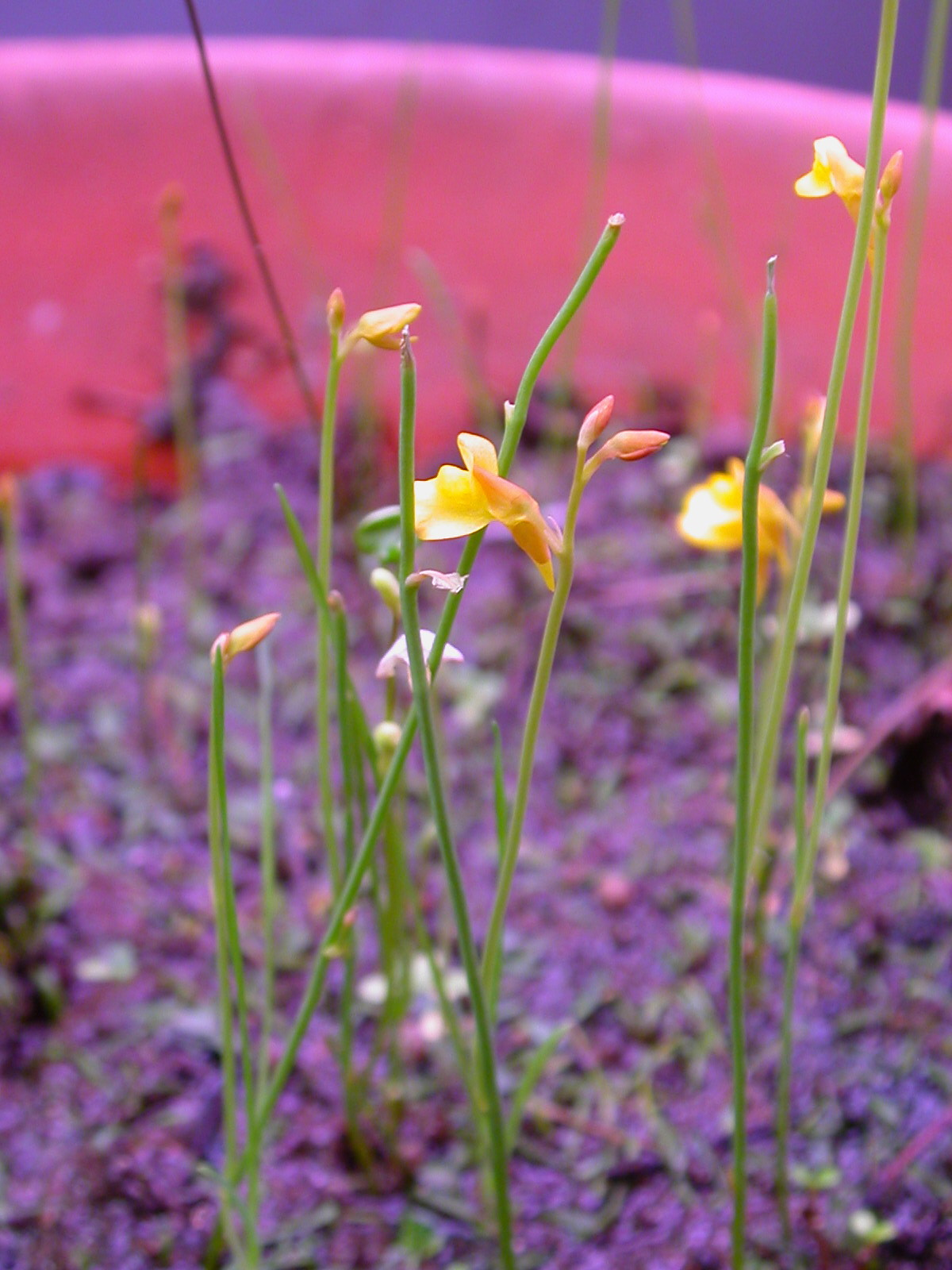
- Utricularia bifida

Scientific classification
- Kingdom: Plantae
- Clade: Tracheophytes
- Clade: Angiosperms
- Clade: Eudicots
- Clade: Asterids
- Order: Lamiales
- Family: Lentibulariaceae
- Genus: Utricularia
- Subgenus: Utricularia subg. Bivalvaria
- Section: Utricularia sect. Oligocista; A.DC.

Type species
- U. bifida L.

Species
- 42, see text.

Synonyms
- Askofake Raf.; Nelipus Raf.; Stomoisia Barnhart; Utricularia subg. Bivalvaria Kurz; [Utricularia sect. Stomoisia (Raf.) Komiya]; Vesiculina Raf., partly

= Utricularia sect. Oligocista =

Group of carnivorous plants

Utricularia sect. Oligocista is the largest section in the genus Utricularia. The 42 species in this section are small to medium-sized terrestrial carnivorous plants native throughout the tropics, with six species in the Americas, ten in Africa, five in Australia, and the remainder in Asia, with 17 mostly native to peninsular India. Alphonse Pyrame de Candolle originally described and published this section in 1844. Peter Taylor published his taxonomic monograph of Utricularia in 1986, in which he placed this section within subgenus Utricularia. More recent phylogenetic data and revisions have reinstated subgenus Bivalvaria and have placed this section within it.

== Species ==
- Utricularia adpressa
- Utricularia albocaerulea
- Utricularia andongensis
- Utricularia arcuata
- Utricularia babui
- Utricularia bifida
- Utricularia bosminifera
- Utricularia cecilii
- Utricularia chiribiquitensis
- Utricularia circumvoluta
- Utricularia delphinioides
- Utricularia densiflora
- Utricularia erectiflora
- Utricularia foveolata
- Utricularia graminifolia
- Utricularia heterosepala
- Utricularia involvens
- Utricularia jackii
- Utricularia laxa
- Utricularia lazulina
- Utricularia letestui
- Utricularia lloydii
- Utricularia macrocheilos
- Utricularia malabarica
- Utricularia meyeri
- Utricularia micropetala
- Utricularia odorata
- Utricularia pierrei
- Utricularia pobeguinii
- Utricularia polygaloides
- Utricularia praeterita
- Utricularia prehensilis
- Utricularia recta
- Utricularia reticulata
- Utricularia scandens
- Utricularia smithiana
- Utricularia spiralis
- Utricularia subramanyamii
- Utricularia tortilis
- Utricularia uliginosa
- Utricularia vitellina
- Utricularia wightiana

== See also ==
- List of Utricularia species
