= Euphorbia pellegrinii =

Conservation status
- Vulnerable (IUCN 3.1)

Scientific classification
- Kingdom: Plantae
- Clade: Tracheophytes
- Clade: Angiosperms
- Clade: Eudicots
- Clade: Rosids
- Order: Malpighiales
- Family: Euphorbiaceae
- Genus: Euphorbia
- Species: E. pellegrinii

Binomial name
- Euphorbia pellegrinii Leandri

Species of flowering plant

Euphorbia pellegrinii is a species of flowering plant in the family Euphorbiaceae. It is endemic to Madagascar. Its natural habitat is subtropical or tropical dry lowland grassland. It is threatened by habitat loss.

The species was first described by Jacques Leandri in 1947, and the specific epithet, pellegrinii, honours François Pellegrin.
