= John McEwan Dalziel =

English botanist (1872–1948)

- Born: 1872; Nagpur
- Died: 1948 (aged 75–76)
- Scientific career
- Fields: Botany, Medicine
- Author abbrev. (botany): Dalziel

John McEwan Dalziel (1872–1948) was a British physician, botanist, and plant collector.

He was born in Nagpur, India in 1872. He served as a medical missionary in China from 1895 to 1902, and afterwards joined the West African Medical Service and became a forest officer from 1905 to 1922. From 1923 he was employed at the Royal Botanic Gardens, Kew, and from 1925 to 1927 he joined the botanical expedition aboard the research vessel Utowana led by botanist David G. Fairchild and funded by philanthropist Allison Vincent Armour. Dalziel also served as the vessel's medical officer. The Fairchild expeditions of visited Sri Lanka, Sumatra and Java in 1926, and coastal West Africa, from Gambia to Bioko, in 1927.

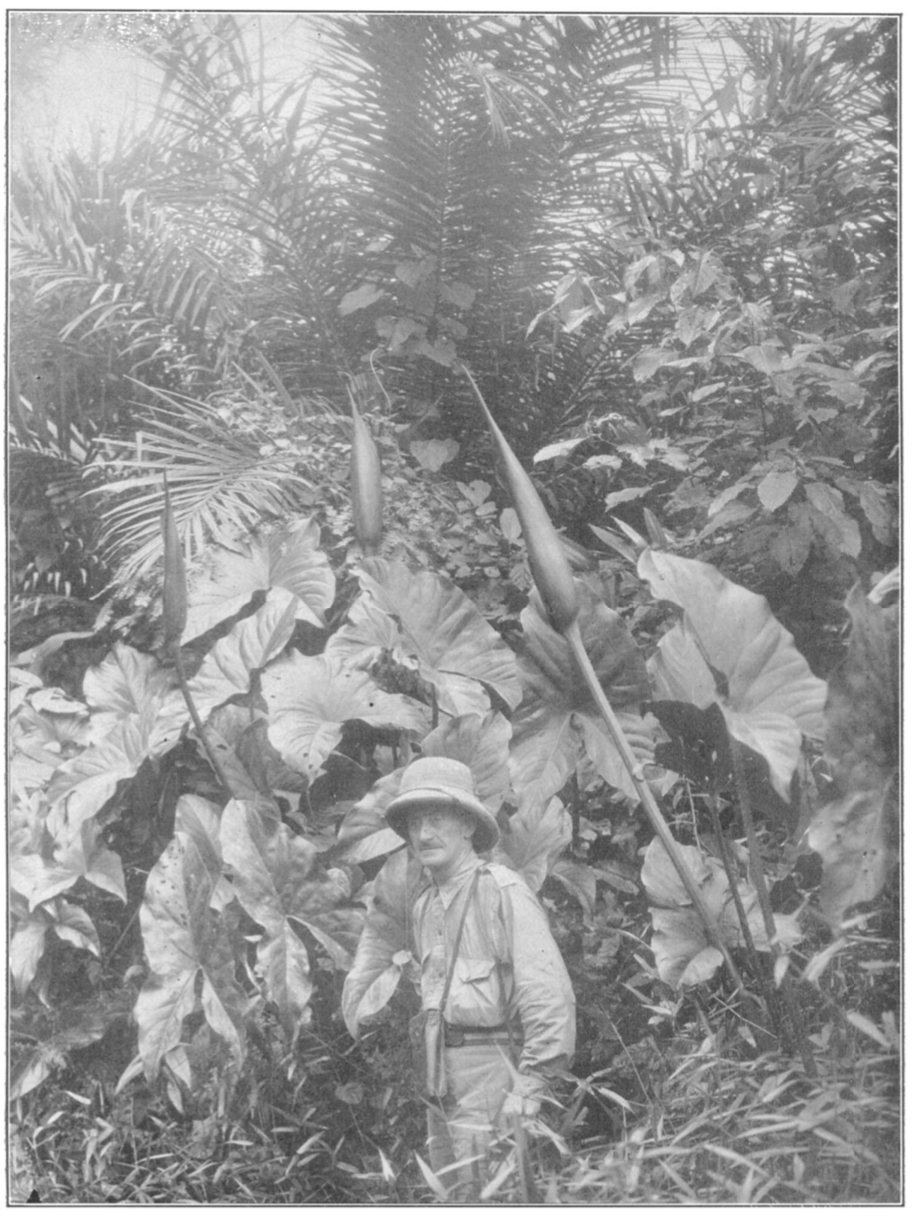
Photo of John McEwan Dalziel with the giant aroid Lasimorpha senegalensis, taken in 1927 near Douala, Cameroon on the Fairchild expedition to West Africa.

Dalziel was active as a plant collector from 1895 to 1927, and collected in China and in present-day Cameroon, Gambia, Ghana, Guinea, Liberia, Niger, Nigeria, and Sierra Leone in tropical Africa.

With Arthur Hugh Garfit Alston and John Hutchinson, he edited the Flora of West Tropical Africa. He authored or co-authored 488 botanical names, many of them with John Hutchinson.
