= Franciszek Kamieński =

Polish botanist (1851–1912)

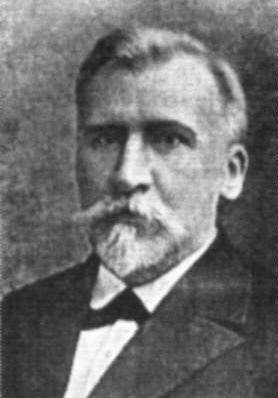
Franciszek Kamieński

Franciszek Kamieński (9 October 1851 – 16 September 1912) was a Polish botanist. His name has also been spelled Frans Michailow von Kamieńsky or misspelled with the accent above the e, as in Kamiénski. Kamieński described and authored many species of Utricularia. The section Kamienskia in the genus Utricularia and the species Utricularia kamienskii are named in his honor.
