= Ludwig Benjamin =

German botanist

Ludwig Benjamin (1825–1848) was a German botanist who contributed to Carl Friedrich Philipp von Martius' Flora Brasiliensis. The genus Benjaminia (in the Plantaginaceae family) is named in his honour.

== See also ==
World Dictionary of Plant Names - Ludwig Benjamin
