= Daniel Oliver (botanist) =

British botanist

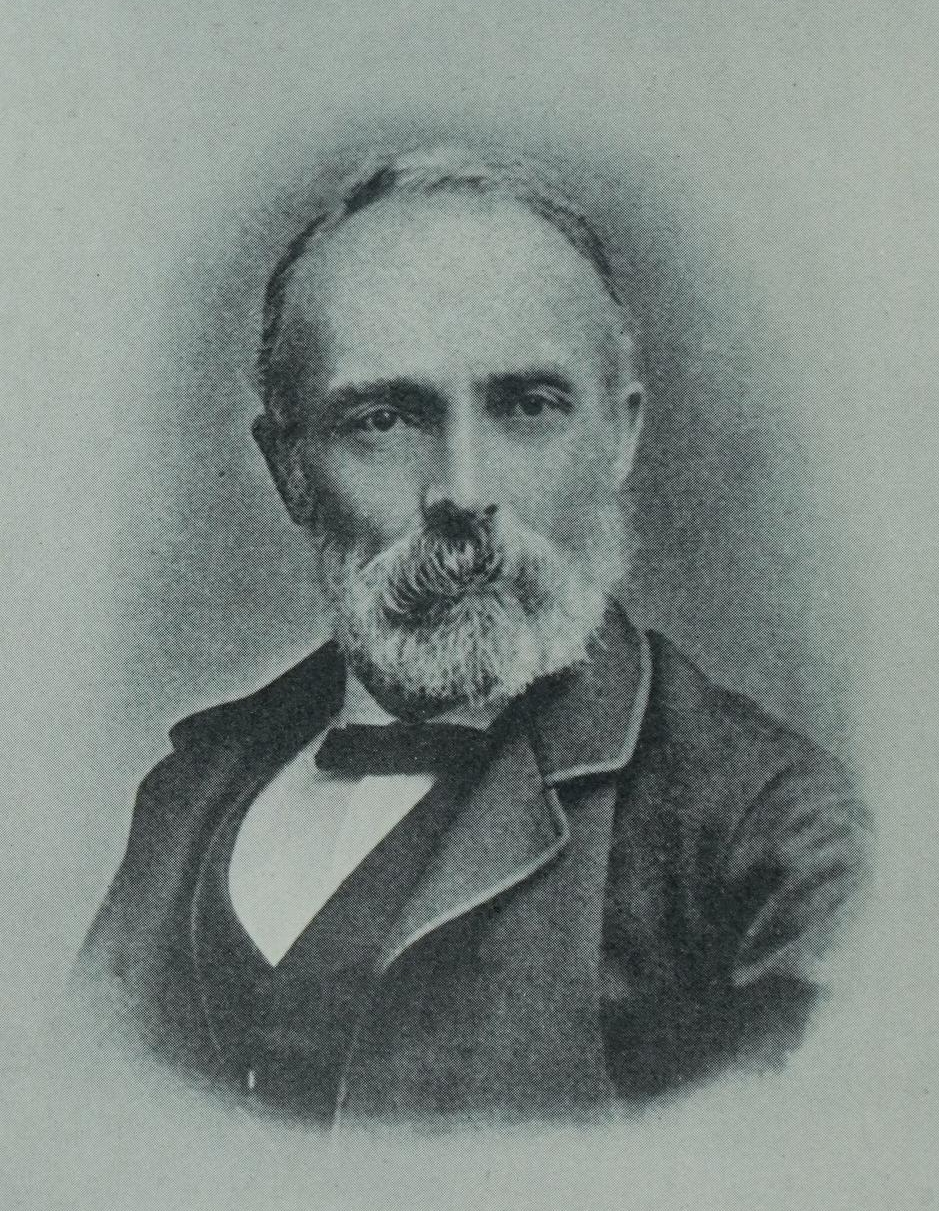

Daniel Oliver, FRS (6 February 1830, Newcastle upon Tyne – 21 December 1916) was an English botanist. He served as a librarian and keeper at Kew while also serving as a professor of botany at University College, London (1861-1881).

== Life and work ==
Oliver was born in Newcastle on Type, son of grocer Daniel Oliver (1806–1878) and Ann née Noble (1804–1878). Coming from a family of Quakers, he went to Friends' school at Wigton from 1839. He took an interest in natural history at the school society and then went to join the family business in 1844 but found it 'utterly distasteful', He joined the Tyneside Naturalists' Field Club and interacted with John Hancock, Sir Walter Trevelyan and others. He was elected to the Edinburgh Botanical Society in 1851. From 1851 he taught botany at Durham medical school. In 1858 he wrote to William Hooker asking if there was an opening on a botanical survey expedition. He was then invited to join Kew and was initially involved in conducting hybridization experiments on behalf of Charles Darwin. He also conducted experiments on Drosera along with Darwin. He was soon made Librarian of the Herbarium, Royal Botanic Gardens, Kew from 1860 to 1890 and Keeper there from 1864 to 1890. With Darwin's recommendation noting Oliver for the range of his knowledge of facts buried in all sorts of foreign publications, his philosophical caution as an experimenter, and a high philosophical order he was appointed Professor of Botany at University College, London in 1861 and worked there until his retirement in 1888. He was an editor of the Natural History Review from 1861 and compiled bibliographies for it.

In 1864, while at UCL, he published Lessons in Elementary Botany, based upon material left in manuscript by John Stevens Henslow, and illustrated by Henslow's daughter, Anne Henslow Barnard of Cheltenham. With a second edition in 1869 and a third in 1878 this book was reprinted until at least 1891. It sold nearly 70000 copies. Oliver regarded this book as suitable for use in schools and for young people remote from the classroom and laboratory. He was elected a member of the Linnean Society in 1853, awarded their Gold Medal in 1893, and awarded a Royal Medal by the Royal Society in 1884.

In 1895, botanist Tiegh published Oliverella, a genus of flowering plants from East Africa, belonging to the family Loranthaceae and named in honour of Daniel Oliver.

== Personal life ==
Oliver married Hannah Hobson Wall (1833/4–1919) in 1861 and was the father of two daughters and a son, Francis Wall Oliver. Oliver was a strict Quaker in his early life but later followed only some of its essential ideas. He enjoyed music and art and collected botanical and Pre-Raphaelite art works.

== Death ==
Oliver died of heart failure at his house on Kew Green on 21 December 1916. He was buried on the 23rd in the grounds of the Isleworth Friends' meeting house.
