= François Pellegrin =

French botanist (1881–1965)

- Born: 25 September 1881; Paris; 6e arrondissement
- Died: 9 April 1965 (aged 83); Paris; 18e arrondissement
- Scientific career
- Fields: Botany
- Author abbrev. (botany): Pellegr.

François Pellegrin (25 September 1881, in Paris's 6^{e} arrondissement – 9 April 1965, in the Hôpital Bichat in the 18^{e} arrondissement) was a French botanist, who specialised in the plants of tropical Africa.

He published some 623 plant names, and has been honoured in the specific epithets of many plant species, such as, for example, Bikinia pellegrinii, Euphorbia pellegrinii, Hymenostegia pellegrinii, Polyceratocarpus pellegrinii, and Sericanthe pellegrinii. He was also honoured in 1935 by botanist Hermann Otto Sleumer who published Pellegrinia, a genus of flowering plants from south America, belonging to the family Ericaceae.

== Biography ==
He studied under Bureau and van Tieghem, and by 1912 had presented his thesis for his doctorate and become an assistant to Professor Paul Henri Lecomte, when war broke out in 1914. In 1914 he was gravely wounded, taken prisoner by the Germans, and after several months "returned" under the requirement to live in a neutral country. Thus, in Switzerland, at the University of Geneva and at the Botanical conservatory, under the professors Robert Hippolyte Chodat and John Isaac Briquet, he returned to his botanical research.

== Selected publications ==
- 1920 Les bois du Cameroun, Paris, E. Larose
- 1924 La Flore du Mayombe d'après les récoltes de M. Georges Le Testu (1re partie), Caen, Société linnéenne de Normandie.
- 1938 La Flore du Mayombe d'après les récoltes de M. Georges Le Testu (3me partie), Caen, Société linnéenne de Normandie.
- 1948 Supplément à la flore générale de l'Indo-Chine; Dichapétalacées. Opiliacées, olacacées, aptandracées, schoepfiacées, erythropalacées, icacinacées, phytocrénacées, cardioptéridacées. Aquifoliacées (with M.-L. Tardieu-Blot & F. Gagnepain), Paris : Muséum d'histoire naturelle.
