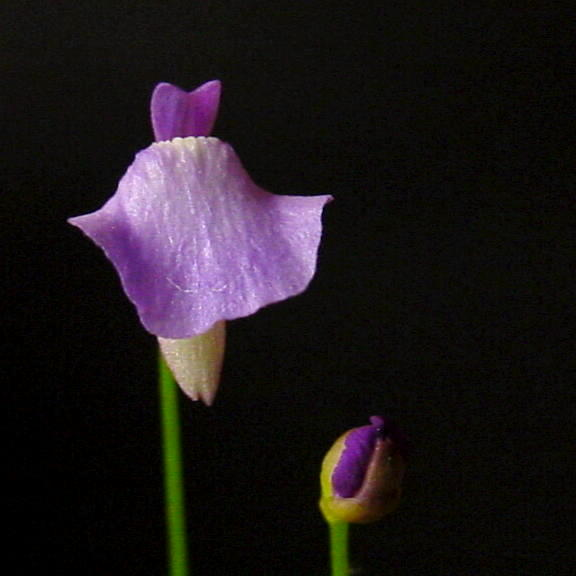
- Utricularia lateriflora, a member of section Australes.

Scientific classification
- Kingdom: Plantae
- Clade: Tracheophytes
- Clade: Angiosperms
- Clade: Eudicots
- Clade: Asterids
- Order: Lamiales
- Family: Lentibulariaceae
- Genus: Utricularia
- Subgenus: Utricularia subg. Bivalvaria; Kurz

Sections
- Aranella; Australes; Avesicarioides; Benjaminia; Calpidisca; Enskide; Lloydia; Minutae; Nigrescentes; Oligocista; Phyllaria; Stomoisia

= Utricularia subg. Bivalvaria =

Subgenus of carnivorous plants

Utricularia subg. Bivalvaria is a subgenus in the genus Utricularia. It was originally described by Wilhelm Sulpiz Kurz in 1874. In Peter Taylor's 1989 monograph on the genus, he reduced the subgenus to synonym under section Oligocista, a decision that was later reversed in the light of molecular phylogenetic studies and the subgenus was restored.

== See also ==
- List of Utricularia species
