= List of carnivorous plant periodicals =

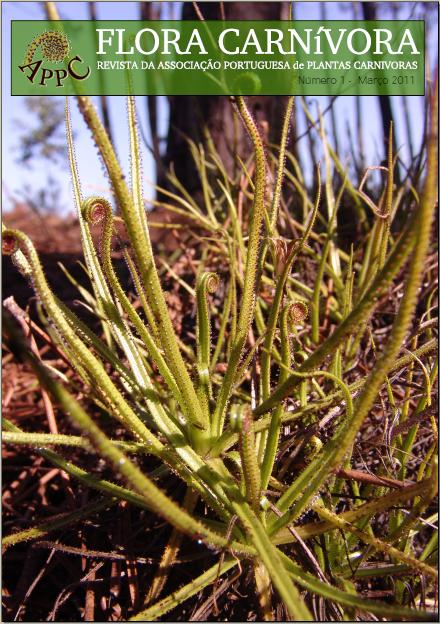
First issue of Flora Carnívora (March 2011), the magazine of the Portuguese Carnivorous Plant Society (APPC)

This list of carnivorous plant periodicals is a listing of periodicals devoted to the subject of carnivorous plants, most of which are (or were) published by carnivorous plant societies. The list includes magazines and journals as well as supplementary newsletters. Notable online periodicals are also listed.

Unless otherwise indicated, all information on individual publications is sourced from them directly or from their official websites. The terms bimonthly, biannual and triannual are used to mean "every two months", "twice a year" and "three times a year", respectively.

== Magazines and journals ==
This list includes the main publications of various carnivorous plant societies. These periodicals are often printed to a high standard and typically carry articles on matters of horticultural interest, together with field reports, literature reviews, and, in some cases, peer reviewed scientific studies. Certain publications self-styled as "newsletters"—notably the Carnivorous Plant Newsletter—fall into this category, and are distinguished from the supplementary newsletters listed below.

| Name | Publication history | Frequency | Publisher | Language | Website | ISSN | OCLC number(s) | Additional information |
|---|---|---|---|---|---|---|---|---|
| Adéla, revue o masožravých rostlinách | 1995–2000? | Irregular | Česká Společnost Pěstitelů Exotických a Vzácných Rostlin (Czech Republic) | Czech | | | 320424066 | Preceded by Pel-Mel o masožravých rostlinách (1991–1993). |
| AIPC Magazine | 1998–present | Quarterly | Associazione Italiana Piante Carnivore (Italy) | Italian | | 1972-8158 (Note: Non-functioning ISSN given in periodical.) | | Previously titled AIPC News (1998–2003). |
| Amatérské Pěstování Masožravých Rostlin | 1990–1995 | Biannual/annual (Note: Initially biannual (1990–1991), later annual (1992–1995).) | association of carnivorous plant growers; later Darwiniana (Czech Republic) | Czech | | | (Note: No OCLC number has been assigned to the periodical as a whole, though issues 3–8 have their own numbers: 320379295, 320380191, 320379073, 320379296, 320380192, and 320379297.) | Eight issues published. Succeeded by Trifid (1996–present). |
| Bay Area Carnivorous Plant Society Newsletter | 1992–present | Quarterly | Bay Area Carnivorous Plant Society (United States) | English | | | 82480495 | Originally a print publication, an electronic edition was introduced in August 2000, with members initially given the option to continue receiving hard copies; now exists only in electronic form (see below). |
| Bulletin of the Australian Carnivorous Plant Society | 1982–2003 | Quarterly | Australian Carnivorous Plant Society (Australia) | English | | 0813-135X | 20230262, 20230420, 183289895, 271730951, 612101080, 716419924 | Previously titled Bulletin / South Australian Carnivorous Plant Society (1982), Bulletin / Australian Carnivorous Plant Society (1982–1983), Bulletin / Australian Carnivorous Plant Society Inc. (1983–1984), Bulletin of the Australian Carnivorous Plant Society, Inc. (1985–1999), and Bulletin / Australian Carnivorous Plant Society, Inc. (2000–2003). |
| Carniflora Australis | 2003–present | Biannual | Australasian Carnivorous Plant Society (Australia) | English | | 1448-9570 | 53959671 | Subtitled Journal of the Australasian Carnivorous Plant Society Inc.. |
| Carnivora | 1987–present | Triannual | Carnivora (Netherlands) | Dutch | | | | |
| Carnivoren Praxis | 1993–? | Monthly | Uwe Westphal and Stefan Lauterbach (Germany) | German | | | | |
| Carnivorous Plant Newsletter | 1972–present | Quarterly (Note: Occasionally triannual when numbers 3 and 4 (1986) or 1 and 2 (1991–1993) were combined into a single issue, or even biannual (1990).) | International Carnivorous Plant Society (United States) | English | | 0190-9215 | 4011202, 228668419, 475049960, 715772789, 756353764, 842902892 | Subtitled Journal of the International Carnivorous Plant Society (1998–present). Volumes 1–35 (1972–2006) have been released together on CD (OCLC 180165356). Society also publishes proceedings from its conferences (OCLC 183246003, 41020023). |
| Carnivorous Plant Newsletter of Australia | 1979–1981 | Quarterly | Ken Hatley and Susan Hatley (Australia) | English | | | 225936365 | Eight issues published between June 1979 and March 1981. |
| Carnivorous Plants Collection CPC | mid-1990s – early 2000s | Irregular (generally quarterly) | Yuyoshi Kunimatsu (Japan) | Japanese | | | | A5 format with colour printing only on the cover. Consisted mainly of cultivation articles but also included sales catalogue. |
| Carnivorous Plant Specialist Group News | 1994–? | | Royal Botanic Gardens, Kew (United Kingdom) | English | | | 715946236 | |
| Carnivorous Plants Digest | 1978–1979 | | Carnivorous Plants Digest Co. (United States) | English | | 0197-7679 | 4564382 | |
| Carnivorous Plants North Queensland Newsletter | 1994–1997 | Irregular (Note: Originally conceived as a monthly newsletter, 5 issues were published in 1994, 7 in 1995, 6 in 1996, and 1 in 1997.) | Carnivorous Plants North Queensland Society (Australia) | English | | | | |
| Das Taublatt | 1984–present | Triannual | Gesellschaft für fleischfressende Pflanzen im deutschsprachigen Raum (Germany) | German with English summaries | | 0942-959X | 85159943, 695468047, 715698010 | Previously subtitled Austausch- und Nachrichtenorgan der Gesellschaft für Fleischfressende Pflanzen and Die Karnivoren-Fachzeitschrift der Gesellschaft für Fleischfressende Pflanzen (until 2000). |
| Dionée | 1984–present | Quarterly | Association Francophone des Amateurs de Plantes Carnivores (Note: Originally called "Association Française d'Amateurs de Plantes Carnivores".) (France) | French | | 1169-9094 | 473455065 | Merged with the society's newsletter (Dionée Supplément) in 2002 to form quarterly magazine (previously biannual). |
| Drosera | 1991–1993? | Biannual | Carnivorous Plants Associations of Slovakia (Slovakia) | Slovak | | | | |
| Drosera Nieuwsblad | 1990–present | Triannual | Drosera vzw (Belgium) | Dutch (Flemish) | | | | |
| Drosophyllum | 2010–present | Biannual | Asociación Española de Plantas Carnívoras (Spain) | Spanish | | 2174-8705 | 796316233 | |
| Flora Carnívora | 2011–present | Biannual | Associação Portuguesa de Plantas Carnívoras (Portugal) | Portuguese | | | | |
| Flytrap News | 1985–2002 | Quarterly | Carnivorous Plant Society of New South Wales (Australia) | English | | 1323-8159 | 14922367, 220848371 | Subtitled Official Newsletter for the Carnivorous Plant Society of NSW. |
| Insectivorous plants communicational paper (ホームガーデン通信) | 1996–2002 | Irregular (generally quarterly) | Tokujin Inaho (Japan) | Japanese | | | | Published between July 1996 and July 2002. A5 format with colour page insert. Published a combination of cultivation articles and meeting reports. |
| International Pinguicula Study Group Newsletter | 1992?–2000 | Irregular (Note: Publication history: volume 1 (not dated), volume 2 (not dated), volume 3 (May/June 1993), volume 4 (February 1994), volume 5 (September 1994), volume 6 (April 1995), volume 7 (January 1996), volume 8 (February 1997), volume 9 (autumn 1998), and volume 10 (autumn 2000).) | The International Pinguicula Study Group (United Kingdom) | English | | | 183251653 | Ten issues published to autumn 2000 (first issue not dated). |
| JCPS Newsletter (食虫植物情報誌) | 1995–present | Quarterly | Japanese Carnivorous Plant Society (Japan) | Japanese | | | 646545104, 723979332 | English version also available. A5 format; printed in colour. |
| Journal of Insectivorous Plant Society, The (食虫植物研究会々誌) | 1950–present | Quarterly | Insectivorous Plant Society (Japan) | Japanese | | 0286-6102 | 28858571, 852196884 | Parallel English title used since 1986. |
| KTKI Bulletin | 2006–2007 | Bimonthly | Komunitas Tanaman Karnivora Indonesia (Indonesia) | Indonesian/English | | | | Five issues published between June/July 2006 and March/April 2007 (August 2006 was skipped). |
| Masožravé Rostliny | 2007–2011 | Biannual/annual (Note: First and final volumes annual (2007, 2011), rest biannual (2008–2010).) | CCPS o.s. (Czech Republic) | Czech with English abstracts | | | | Eight issues published between December 2007 and June 2011. Society also distributed biannual newsletter (Zpravodaj CCPS) electronically. Both have been replaced by direct publishing of articles on website. |
| NIP Botanical News | | Monthly? | Nansow Insectivorous Plants Botanical Garden (Japan) | Japanese/English | | | | |
| Pel-Mel o masožravých rostlinách | 1991–1993 | Biannual/annual (Note: Initially biannual (1991), later annual (1992–1993).) | FiBox Třebíč (Czech Republic) | Czech | | | 84994448 | Included translations of articles from other magazines, such as the Carnivorous Plant Newsletter, Das Taublatt, and Dionée. Succeeded by Adéla, revue o masožravých rostlinách (1995–2000?). |
| Planta Carnivora | 1980–present | Biannual | The Carnivorous Plant Society (United Kingdom) | English | | 0260-440X | 13024012, 124052068, 716419435, 855254047, 856570150 | Previously titled The Carnivorous Plant Society Journal (1980–2009). Merged with the society's newsletter (CPS News) in 2010 to form Planta Carnivora. |
| Stenopetala | 1982–present | Quarterly | The New Zealand Carnivorous Plant Society (New Zealand) | English | | 1175-9305 | 19577559, 50219329, 716418934 | Subtitled Journal of the New Zealand Carnivorous Plant Society. Previously titled The New Zealand Carnivorous Plant Society Journal or Bulletin (1982–2002). |
| Sundew | 1980s | | Brisbane Carnivorous Plant Society (Australia) | English | | | 17504529 | Subtitled The Magazine of the Brisbane Carnivorous Plant Society. |
| TCPS Homepage (東海食虫植物情報誌) | 1998–2000 | Irregular (generally quarterly) | Tokai Carnivorous Plant Society (Japan) | Japanese | | | | Five issues published between December 1998 and September 2000. One supplement was also released: a Nepenthes photo album (ネペンテスのフォトアルバム「阿片」). A5 format; printed in colour from the beginning. Consisted mainly of cultivation articles. |
| Tlalit | 2002?–2003 | Triannual | Carnivorous Plant Society of Israel (Israel) | Hebrew with English summaries | | | | Five issues published. |
| Trifid | 1996–present | Quarterly (Note: Occasionally triannual (1997–2000, 2012–2013) when numbers 3 and 4 were combined into a single issue.) | Darwiniana (Czech Republic) | Czech with English summaries | | 1214-4134 | 315370847, 320698184, 723766115 | Subtitled Časopis Společnosti Darwiniana (2006–present). Preceded by Amatérské Pěstování Masožravých Rostlin (1990–1995). |
| Victorian Carnivorous Plant Society Inc. | 1984–present | Quarterly | Victorian Carnivorous Plant Society (Australia) | English | | 1033-6966 | 220647414 | Previously titled Victorian Carnivorous Plant Society. Society also distributes the Carnivorous plants total listing (OCLC 221725614). |

== Newsletters ==
This list includes supplementary publications of various carnivorous plant societies. These typically provide society-related news, information on upcoming meetings and events, as well as seed and plant sales lists.

| Name | Publication history | Frequency | Publisher | Language | Website | OCLC number(s) | Additional information |
|---|---|---|---|---|---|---|---|
| Bay Area Carnivorous Plant Society Bulletin | 2003–present | Monthly, later irregular | Bay Area Carnivorous Plant Society (United States) | English | | | Thirty-four issues published between June 2003 and May 2012. |
| CPS News | 1978–2010 | Biannual | The Carnivorous Plant Society (United Kingdom) | English | | 13024061, 23260740, 23260765, 23260784, 23260838, 716421207 | Previously titled The Carnivorous Plant Society Newsletter (1978–1989). Issues from the first 25 years (1978–2003) have been released together on CD. Merged with the society's journal (The Carnivorous Plant Society Journal) in 2010 to form Planta Carnivora. |
| Dionée Supplément | 1984–2002 | Quarterly | Association Francaise des Amateurs de Plantes Carnivores (France) | French | | 716417013 | Merged with the society's journal (Dionée) in 2002 to form quarterly magazine (previously biannual). |
| NZCPS Newsbrief | | Monthly | The New Zealand Carnivorous Plant Society (New Zealand) | English | | 173375153 | |
| Rundbrief | 1991–present | Triannual | Gesellschaft für fleischfressende Pflanzen im deutschsprachigen Raum (Germany) | German | | 263888434, 717439385 | Previously titled Der Rundbrief (until 2005). Society also distributes an annual book (Das Jahrbuch; OCLC 614441193, 183249104, 724458685) and an electronic newsletter (G.F.P.-Newsletter). |

== Online publications ==
This list includes notable online magazines and other regular electronic publications that have received an International Standard Serial Number or OCLC number.

| Name | Publication history | Frequency | Publisher | Language | Website | ISSN | OCLC number(s) | Additional information |
|---|---|---|---|---|---|---|---|---|
| Bay Area Carnivorous Plant Society Newsletter | 1992–present | Quarterly | Bay Area Carnivorous Plant Society (United States) | English | | | 82480495 | Originally a print publication (see above), an electronic edition was introduced in August 2000 and the newsletter now exists only in this form. The current HTML format was adopted in March 2004; previously the newsletter had been e-mailed to members in plain text. |
| Carniflora News | 2009–present | | Australasian Carnivorous Plant Society (Australia) | English | | 1837-5839 | 465191136 | |
