= List of horticulture and gardening books and publications =

This list of horticulture and gardening books includes notable gardening books and journals, which can to aid in research and for residential gardeners in planning, planting, harvesting, and maintaining gardens. Gardening books encompass a variety of subjects from garden design, vegetable gardens, perennial gardens, to shade gardens. Every plant genus or category of plants may also be covered including roses, clematis, bulbs, hellebores, and hydrangeas. The Internet has expanded and enhanced the availability of gardening resources. Online plant databases, photographic collections, as well as detailed articles and blogs greatly add to the range and depth of home gardening information.

== Books ==
=== Early works ===
- Sakuteiki (11th century) - the oldest work on Japanese gardening
- The Profitable Arte of Gardening (1563) - the first English book on gardening
- The Gardener's Labyrinth (1577) - noted for its illustrations of Elizabethan gardens

=== Compost ===
- Compost Everything - composting book by David the Good

=== Containers ===
- Fisher, S. (1999). Scented containers: great ideas for year-round fragrance. NY: Sterling Pub. (ISBN 0-7063-7800-8)

=== Design ===
- Easton, V. (2007). A pattern garden: the essential elements of garden making. Portland: Timber Press. (ISBN 0-88192-780-5)
- Ely, Helena Rutherfurd (1903). A Woman's Hardy Garden.
- Ely, Helena Rutherfurd (1905). Another Hardy Garden Book.
- Ely, Helena Rutherfurd (1911). The Practical Flower Garden.
- Williams, B. (1998). On garden style. New York: Simon & Schuster. (ISBN 0-684-82605-4)

=== Diseases and pests ===
- Cranshaw, Whitney. Garden insects of North America: The Ultimate Guide to Backyard Bugs. Princeton University Press, 2004, ISBN 0-691-09560-4

=== Fruits ===
- Morgan, J. Richards, A. and Dowle E. The New Book of Apples: The Definitive Guide to Over 2,000 Varieties. (2003). Ebury.

=== Inspirational ===
- Lacy, A. (1998).The inviting garden: gardening for the senses, mind, and spirit. NY: Henry Holt.
- Jarman, Derek and Sooley, Howard. (1995). Derek Jarman's Garden. Thames & Hudson.
- Cobbett, William. (1833). The English Gardener. (Full view). Harvard University.
- Heizer, Roy (2009) Savannah's Garden Plants (Schiffer Publishing)
- Alexander, William (2006) The $64 Tomato (Algonquin Books)

=== Perennials and plants ===
- Di-Sabato-Aust, T. (1998). The well-tended perennial garden: planting & pruning techniques. Portland: Timber Press.
- Howells, J. (1996). The rose and the clematis as good companions. Woodbridge: Garden Art Press. (ISBN 1-870673-19-0)
- Harper, P.J. (2000). Time-tested plants: thirty years in a four-season garden. Portland: Timber Press.
- Mabey, Richard. Flora Britannica. (1992). Cornell University.
- Platt, Karen (2003). Black Magic and Purple Passion: Complete Guide to Dark Plants. Karen Platt. ISBN 978-0-9528810-9-4.

=== Plant information ===
- Damrosch, B. (2008). The Garden Primer. (2nd ed). New York: Workman. (ISBN 0-7611-2275-3)
- Dirr, M.A. (1997). Dirr’s hardy trees and shrubs: an illustrated encyclopedia. Portland: Timber Press. (ISBN 0-88192-404-0)
- Dirr, M.A. (1998). Manual of woody landscape plants: their identification, ornamental characteristics, culture, propagation and uses. Champaign, IL: Stipes. (ISBN 0-87563-800-7)
- Dirr, M.A. (2002). Dirr's Trees and Shrubs for Warm Climates: An Illustrated Encyclopedia (ISBN 088192525X)
- Pears, P. (2002). Rodale's illustrated encyclopedia of organic gardening. New York: DK Pub. (ISBN 0-7894-8908-2)
- Smith, Jim. The Wise Old Gnome Speaks: How to Really, Really, Really Care About Your Garden

=== Reference books ===
- Hortus Third
- American Horticultural Society A-Z Encyclopedia of Garden Plants
- Manual of Woody Landscape Plants Michael Dirr

=== Shrubs and trees ===
- Bean, W.J, Trees and Shrubs Hardy in the British Isles
- The Hillier Manual of Trees and Shrubs

=== Textbooks ===
- Epstein, E. and Bloom, A.J. (2005). Mineral Nutrition of Plants: Principles and Perspectives. (2nd ed). Sunderland: Sinauer Associates. (ISBN 978-0878931729)

== Journals and periodicals ==
- Baileya – a scientific journal of horticultural taxonomy
- Davidsonia
- Dionée
- Flore des Serres et des Jardins de l'Europe (1845–1888)
- Journal of Applied Horticulture
- Planta Carnivora
- Stenopetala
- Trifid – a quarterly Czech-language periodical and the official publication of Darwiniana a carnivorous plant society based in the Czech Republic.
- Victorian Carnivorous Plant Society Journal

== Magazines ==
- BBC Gardeners' World - monthly, published by Immediate Media Company
- The Garden – the monthly magazine of the British Royal Horticultural Society
- The Plantsman – published quarterly by the Royal Horticultural Society

== Plant databases ==
- UI Plants. Gary J. Kling. 2008. University of Illinois at Urbana-Champaign. 17 Mar. 2008

== See also ==
- List of horticultural magazines
- Lists of books
