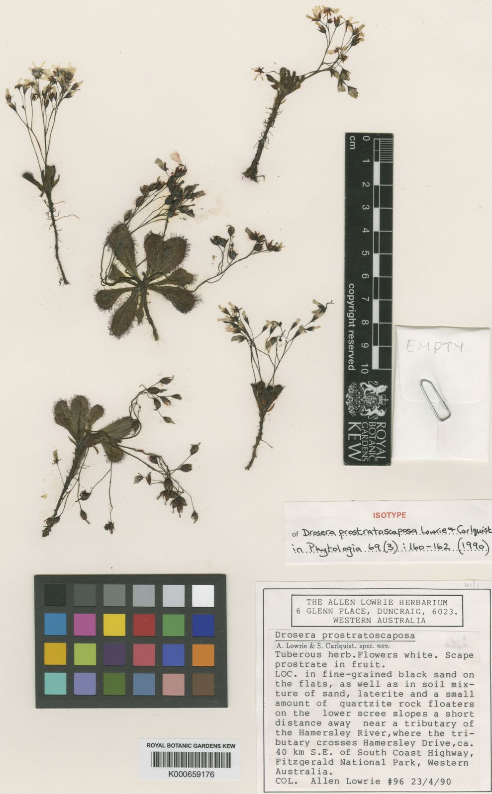

Scientific classification
- Kingdom: Plantae
- Clade: Tracheophytes
- Clade: Angiosperms
- Clade: Eudicots
- Order: Caryophyllales
- Family: Droseraceae
- Genus: Drosera
- Subgenus: Drosera subg. Ergaleium
- Section: Drosera sect. Erythrorhiza
- Species: D. prostratoscaposa

Binomial name
- Drosera prostratoscaposa Lowrie & Carlquist

= Drosera prostratoscaposa =

Species of carnivorous plant

Drosera prostratoscaposa is a perennial tuberous species in the genus Drosera that is endemic to Western Australia. It grows in a rosette about 8 cm in diameter. It is native to a small area in the Fitzgerald River National Park 40 km south-east of the South Coast Highway in between Albany and Esperance. It grows in fine black sandy soils. It is considered to be closely related to D. macrophylla and D. bulbosa, but differs from these by the presence of multiple jasmine-scented flowers on its scapes and petiolate leaves.

It was first discovered in 1989 by Phill Mann and then formally described by Allen Lowrie and Sherwin Carlquist in 1990.

== See also ==
- List of Drosera species
