= Drosera browniana =

Scientific classification
- Kingdom: Plantae
- Clade: Tracheophytes
- Clade: Angiosperms
- Clade: Eudicots
- Order: Caryophyllales
- Family: Droseraceae
- Genus: Drosera
- Subgenus: Drosera subg. Ergaleium
- Section: Drosera sect. Erythrorhiza
- Species: D. browniana

Binomial name
- Drosera browniana Lowrie & N.G.Marchant

Species of plant endemic to Western Australia

Drosera browniana is a perennial tuberous species in the genus Drosera that is endemic to Western Australia. It grows in a rosette about 3 to 4 cm in diameter. It is a common species in an area from Mount Holland to Hatters Hill along the greenstone belt northwest of Esperance. It grows in loam soils in wet zones near granite outcrops. It flowers from August to September. It is considered to be related to D. bulbosa. It was first formally described by Allen Lowrie and N. G. Marchant in 1992 and named in honour of Andrew Brown, who discovered this species' first population.

== See also ==
- List of Drosera species
