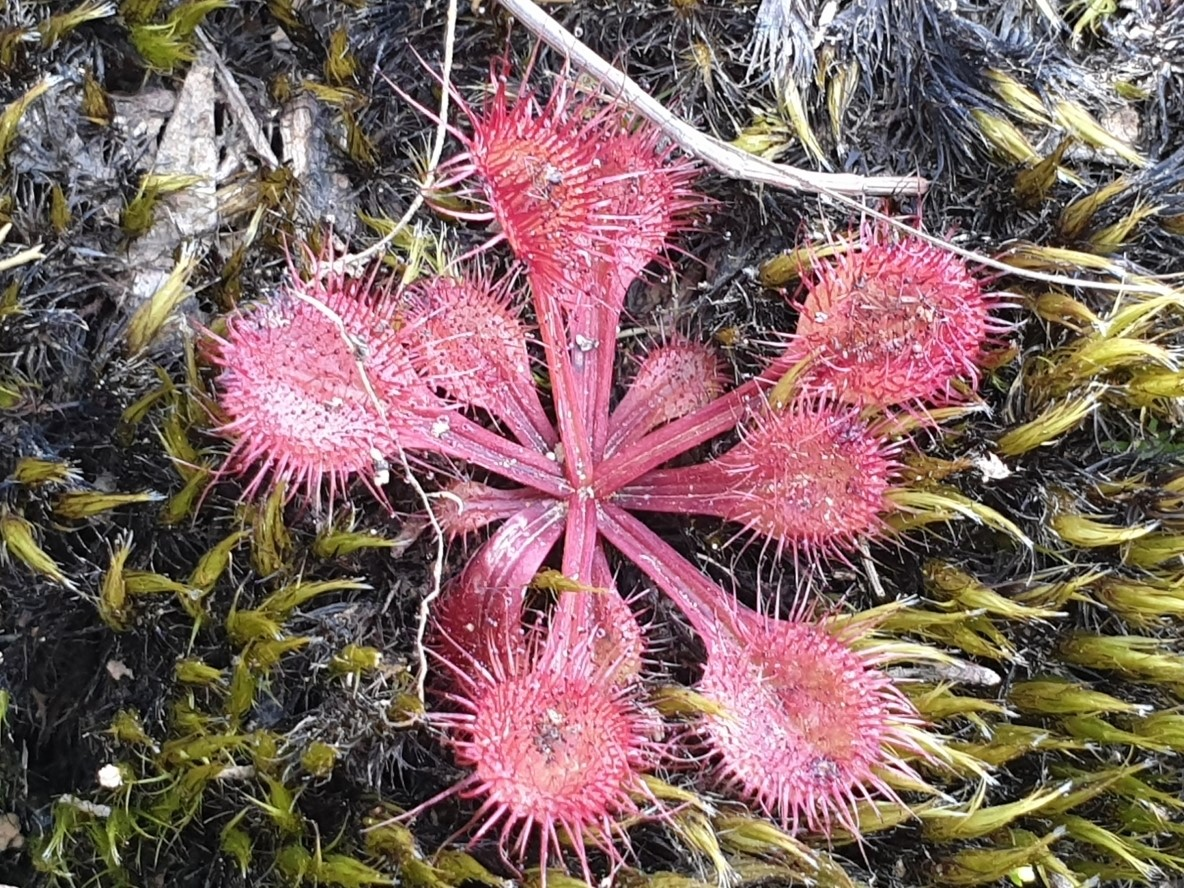

Scientific classification
- Kingdom: Plantae
- Clade: Tracheophytes
- Clade: Angiosperms
- Clade: Eudicots
- Order: Caryophyllales
- Family: Droseraceae
- Genus: Drosera
- Subgenus: Drosera subg. Ergaleium
- Section: Drosera sect. Erythrorhiza
- Species: D. schmutzii

Binomial name
- Drosera schmutzii Lowrie & Conran

= Drosera schmutzii =

Species of plant

Drosera schmutzii, also known as Schmutz's sundew, is a perennial species of tuberous plant in the family Droseraceae. It is endemic to Kangaroo Island in South Australia and occurs mostly in the northern and eastern areas. It grows in sandy clay with laterite soils in open areas amongst Allocasuarina muelleriana and often in the presence of Stylidium tepperianum. Drosera schmutzii grows in a rosette 3 to 4 cm in diameter with green to red leaves. It flowers from June to September.

== Botanical history ==
Drosera schmutzii was first discovered in September 2002 by Father Erwin Schmutz, for whom the species is named. It was also collected and informally described by C. Clayton in 2003. It was then grown in cultivation for several years while further specimens were examined and finally formally described by Allen Lowrie and John Godfrey Conran in 2008. It differs from Drosera whittakeri by its very narrow eglandular petioles, semi-erect leaves, and presence of a few whorled leaves separated from the main basal rosette of leaves.

== See also ==
- List of Drosera species
