= AIPC =

AIPC may refer to:

- AIPC Magazine, official publication of the Italian Carnivorous Plant Society Associazione Italiana Piante Carnivore
- All India Professionals Congress, a wing of the Indian National Congress party
- America's Incredible Pizza Company, an American restaurant chain based in Springfield, Missouri
