= Bulletin of the Australian Carnivorous Plant Society =

- Volume 21, issue 2 (June 2002)
- Discipline: Botany
- Language: English

Publication details
- History: 1982–2003
- Publisher: Australian Carnivorous Plant Society (Australia)
- Frequency: Quarterly

Standard abbreviations
- ISO 4: Bull. Aust. Carniv. Plant Soc.

Indexing
- ISSN: 0813-135X
- OCLC no.: 612101080

Links
- Journal homepage

The Bulletin of the Australian Carnivorous Plant Society was a quarterly periodical and the official publication of the Australian Carnivorous Plant Society. Established in April 1982 as Bulletin / South Australian Carnivorous Plant Society, it continued publication until 2003. In a special general meeting of society members, in September 2004, it was decided the bulletin would cease publication. Typical articles included matters of horticultural interest, field reports, literature reviews, and scientific studies. The headquarters was in Adelaide.

== Taxon names ==
The bulletin published a number of taxonomic changes by botanist Allen Lowrie, including the transfer of Utricularia westonii to the genus Polypompholyx and the reduction of Drosera praefolia to a subspecies of Drosera whittakeri. The bulletin also originated the names Drosera henryana (a nomen nudum for the hybrid D. capensis × D. aliciae) and Sarracenia leucophylla var. pubescens (also a nomen nudum).

The bulletin originated the cultivar name Nepenthes 'Fulgent Koto' and provided descriptions for the cultivars Nepenthes 'Aichi', Nepenthes 'Nagoya', Nepenthes 'Suzue Kondo', and Nepenthes 'Tokuyoshi Kondo'.
