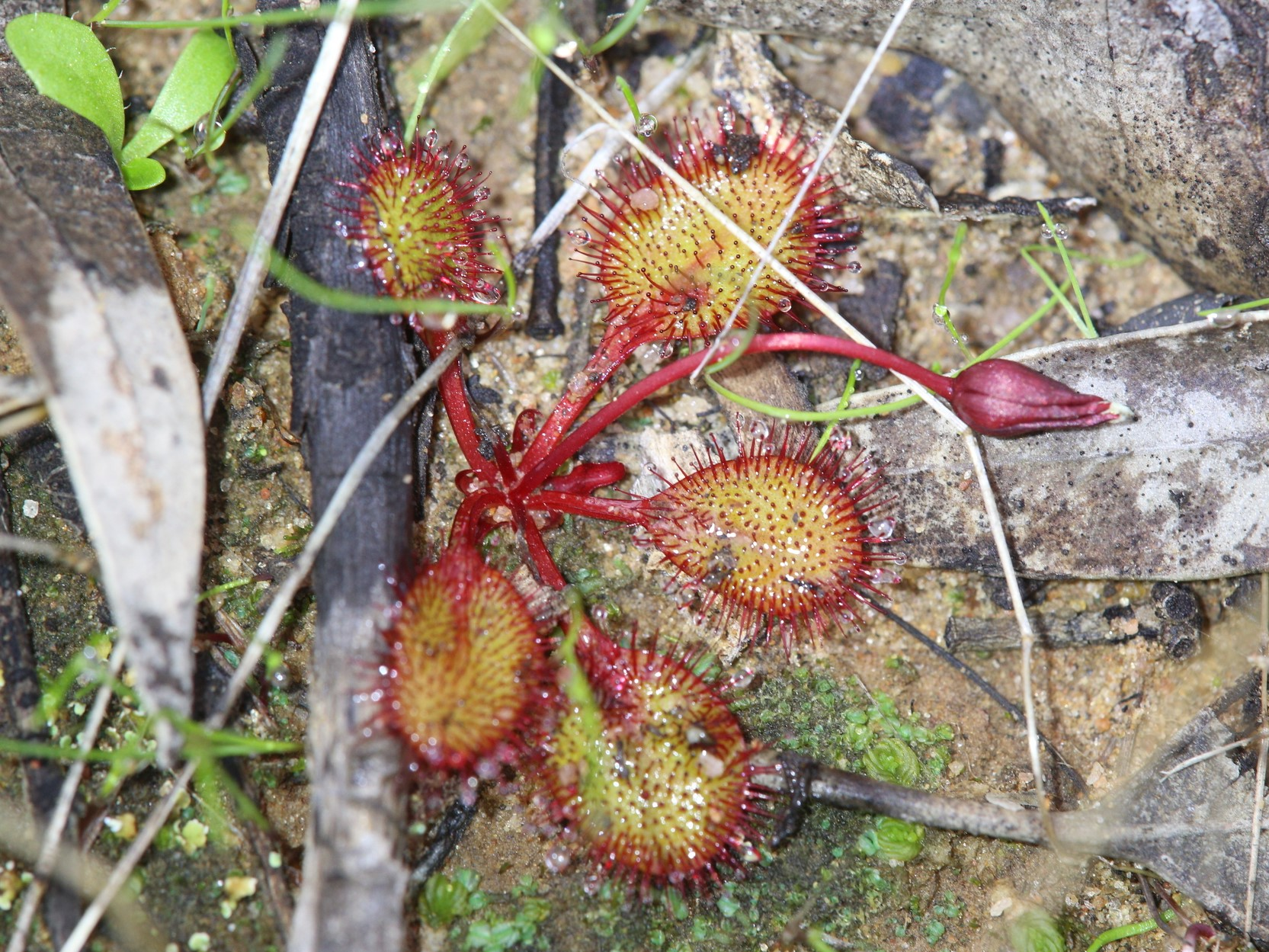

Scientific classification
- Kingdom: Plantae
- Clade: Tracheophytes
- Clade: Angiosperms
- Clade: Eudicots
- Order: Caryophyllales
- Family: Droseraceae
- Genus: Drosera
- Subgenus: Drosera subg. Ergaleium
- Section: Drosera sect. Erythrorhiza
- Species: D. orbiculata

Binomial name
- Drosera orbiculata N.G.Marchant & Lowrie

= Drosera orbiculata =

Species of carnivorous plant

Drosera orbiculata is a perennial tuberous species in the genus Drosera that is endemic to Western Australia. It grows in a rosette about 1.5 cm in diameter. It is native to an area 1.3 km north of Gillingarra near Perth. It grows in sandy clay soils in winter-wet depressions and washes. It is considered to be related to D. rosulata. The species is named for the shape of the leaf lamina. It was first formally described by Allen Lowrie and N. G. Marchant in 1992.

== See also ==
- List of Drosera species
