= Drosera lowriei =

Conservation status
- Least Concern (IUCN 3.1)

Scientific classification
- Kingdom: Plantae
- Clade: Tracheophytes
- Clade: Angiosperms
- Clade: Eudicots
- Order: Caryophyllales
- Family: Droseraceae
- Genus: Drosera
- Subgenus: Drosera subg. Ergaleium
- Section: Drosera sect. Erythrorhiza
- Species: D. lowriei

Binomial name
- Drosera lowriei N.G.Marchant
- It is endemic to Western Australia

Synonyms
- Sondera lowriei (N.G.Marchant) Chrtek & Slavíková

Species of carnivorous plant

Drosera lowriei is a perennial tuberous species in the genus Drosera that is endemic to Western Australia. It grows in a rosette about 3 cm in diameter. It is native to an area northwest of Esperance. It grows in loam soils in wet zones near granite outcrops. It is considered to be related to D. zonaria. It was first formally described by N. G. Marchant in 1992 and named in honour of Allen Lowrie.

== Description ==
=== Vegetative characteristics ===
Drosera lowriei are perennial, tuberous herbs with 4 cm wide, and 2 cm tall rosettes of overlapping, green to red, obovate or spathulate leaves, which decrease in size towards the centre of the rosette.

=== Generative characteristics ===
The solitary, white flowers produced on 1.5 cm long scapes have ovate, 3.5 mm long, and 1.5 mm wide sepals. The capsule fruits, borne one a prostrate scape, bears spherical seeds.

== Taxonomy ==
It was published by Neville Graeme Marchant in 1992. The type specimen was collected by A. Lowrie in Purnta Rock, Western Australia on the 12th of September 1984. It has one synonym: Sondera lowriei (N.G.Marchant) Chrtek & Slavíková published by Jindřich Chrtek and Zdeňka Slavíková in 2000. The specific epithet lowriei honours Allen Lowrie.

== Ecology ==
It occurs in coarse, sandy soil.

== Conservation ==
The IUCN conservation status is least concern (LC).

== See also ==
- List of Drosera species
