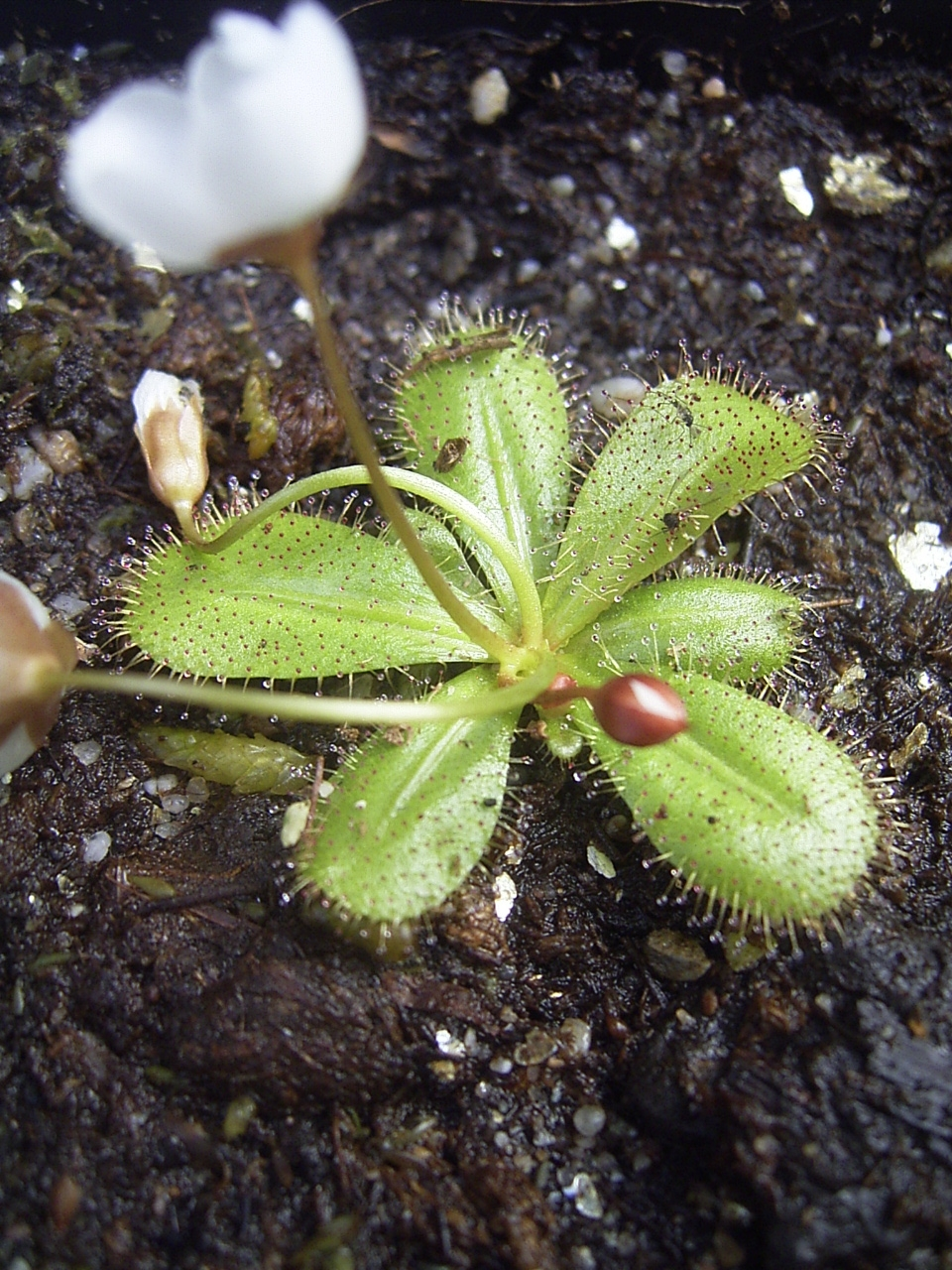

Scientific classification
- Kingdom: Plantae
- Clade: Tracheophytes
- Clade: Angiosperms
- Clade: Eudicots
- Order: Caryophyllales
- Family: Droseraceae
- Genus: Drosera
- Subgenus: Drosera subg. Ergaleium
- Section: Drosera sect. Erythrorhiza
- Species: D. tubaestylis

Binomial name
- Drosera tubaestylis N.G.Marchant & Lowrie

= Drosera tubaestylis =

Species of carnivorous plant

Drosera tubaestylis is a perennial tuberous species in the genus Drosera that is endemic to Western Australia. It grows in a rosette about 2 to 3 cm in diameter. It is native to an area near Perth. It grows in fine sandy clay soils at the margins of swamps. It is considered to be related to D. bulbosa. The species is named for the trumpet-shaped style apices. It was first formally described by Allen Lowrie and N. G. Marchant in 1992.

== See also ==
- List of Drosera species
