= Insectivorous Plants =

Book by Charles Darwin

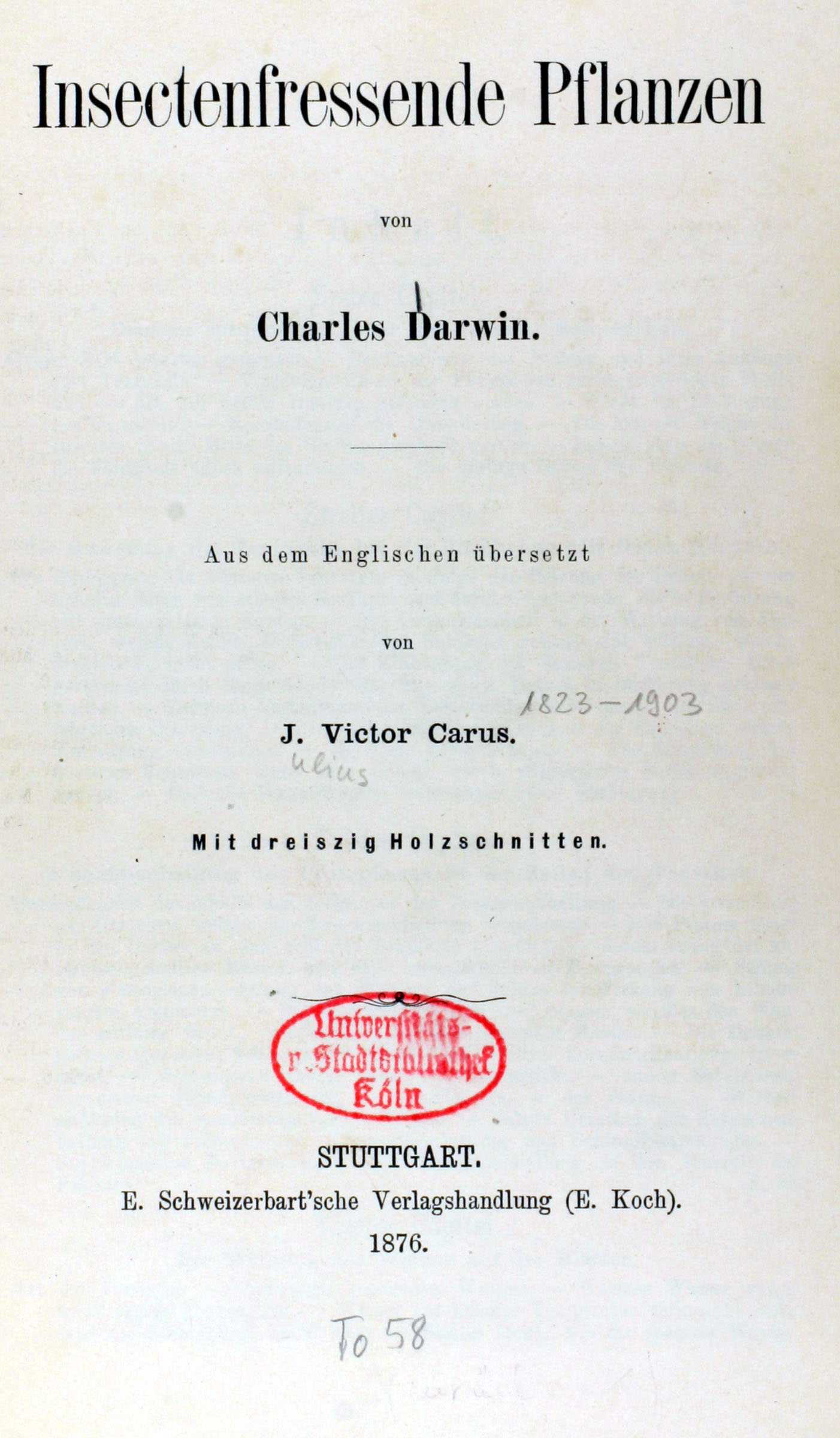
- Cover of 1876 German translation
- Author: Charles Darwin
- Subject: Botany, Evolution
- Publisher: John Murray
- Publication date: 2 July 1875
- Publication place: United Kingdom

Insectivorous Plants is a book by British naturalist and evolutionary theory pioneer Charles Darwin, first published on 2 July 1875 in London.

Part of a series of works by Darwin related to his theory of natural selection, the book is a study of carnivorous plants with specific attention paid to the adaptations that allow them to live in difficult conditions. It includes illustrations by Darwin himself, along with drawings by his sons George and Francis Darwin.

The book chronicles Darwin's experiments with various carnivorous plants, in which he carefully studied their feeding mechanisms. Darwin tried several methods to stimulate the plants into activating their trap mechanisms, including feeding them meat and glass, blowing on them, and prodding them with hair. He found that only the movement of an animal would cause the plants to react, and concluded that this was an evolutionary adaptation to conserve energy for prey and to ignore stimuli that were not likely to be nutritious. He also discovered that while some plants have distinct trap-like structures, others produce sticky fluids to ensnare their prey and concluded that this was an example of natural selection pressure resulting in various methods for food capture.

The first edition had a reported printing of 3,000 copies. It was translated into several languages during Darwin's lifetime, including German. A second English-language edition was published in 1888 after Darwin's death. It was edited with additions and footnotes by Francis Darwin.

== Summary ==
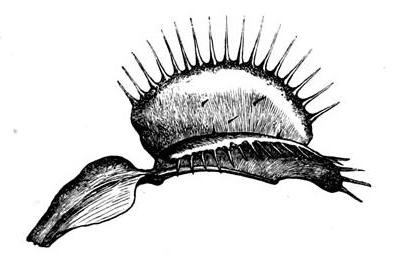
Drawing of a Venus flytrap, one of the plants Darwin studied, from the German translation

All page numbers refer to where the quotes can be found in the 1875 John Murray edition.

From his initial observations in 1860 of Drosera rotundifolia, the common sundew, Darwin developed a series of experiments, ultimately establishing how "excellently adapted" these plants are to catching insects (p. 3). Darwin knew that these plants flourish in nitrogen-limited environments, growing in bogs, poor peaty soil, and moss (p. 18). Most plants receive nutrients from the soil through their roots, but these plants have poor root systems and have adapted to receive nutrients (primarily nitrogenous substances) from captured insects.

Darwin noted that Drosera and other carnivorous plants also feed on seeds, thus also making them vegetable feeders (p. 134).

His notable observations are (p. 3–4):

1. The sensitivity of the glands to slight pressure and to minute doses of nitrogenous substances. He noted that although there is extreme sensitivity, it is wholly appropriate to the purpose of gaining sustenance, e.g. they do not respond to heavy rain falling on them nor to the wind blowing other leaves against them. They have adapted well to insects alighting upon them, and this saves them from wasting energy through excess movement.

2. The power to digest nitrogenous substances by secreting digestive matter and then absorbing them. He noted that digestion follows a similar pattern to animal processes (p. 135) in that acid is added to ferment the nutrient source(equivalent to pepsin). How they adapted this process from already existing substances in their system is explored later on in the book (p. 361).

3. The changes which took place within the cells when the glands are excited in various ways. A major part of the book enumerates his experiments on Drosera rotundifolia. Darwin then turns his attention to other varieties of insectivorous plants and makes comparisons, noting that in some cases different parts of the leaf are used for digestion and others for absorption of decayed matter (p. 330–331). He conjectured that plants may become adapted exclusively to one of these functions by gradually losing the other over a period of time. This would explain how Pinguicula and Utricularia came to use different functions even though they belong to the same family; p. 331).

Darwin wrote in his autobiography that "the fact that a plant should secrete, when properly excited, a fluid containing an acid and ferment, closely analogous to the digestive fluid of an animal, was certainly a remarkable discovery."

== See also ==
- Insectivorous Plant Society
