= The Journal of Insectivorous Plant Society =

Quarterly Japanese-language periodical

- Volume 55, issue 1 (January 2004)
- Discipline: Botany
- Language: Japanese

Publication details
- History: 1950–present
- Publisher: Insectivorous Plant Society (Japan)
- Frequency: Quarterly

Standard abbreviations
- ISO 4: J. Insectivorous Plant Soc.

Indexing
- ISSN: 0286-6102
- OCLC no.: 28858571

Links
- Journal homepage

The Journal of Insectivorous Plant Society (食虫植物研究会々誌, Shokuchūshokubutsu kenkyū-kai kaishi) is a quarterly Japanese-language periodical and the official publication of the Insectivorous Plant Society of Japan. The journal was established in January 1950. As of 2010, it was published in A4 format and totals around 120 pages annually. The English title has been used alongside the original Japanese one from the April 1986 issue onwards.

Typical articles include matters of horticultural interest, field reports, literature reviews, and new taxon and cultivar descriptions. They are usually entirely in Japanese, although species descriptions may also be in English.

== Taxon descriptions ==
The Journal of Insectivorous Plant Society has published formal descriptions of the following taxa.

=== Nepenthes ===
- Nepenthes eymae (as N. eymai)
- Nepenthes × ferrugineomarginata
- Nepenthes × kinabaluensis
- Nepenthes × kuchingensis
- Nepenthes maxima f. undulata
- Nepenthes mindanaoensis
- Nepenthes peltata
- Nepenthes × pyriformis (as a species)
- Nepenthes rubromaculata (later homonym)
- Nepenthes saranganiensis

=== Utricularia ===
- Utricularia linearis
- Utricularia ramosissima (regarded as a synonym of Utricularia geoffrayi)

=== Cultivars ===
The journal also published the following Nepenthes cultivar names of the 'Koto' series by K. Kawase.

- Nepenthes 'Accentual Koto'
- Nepenthes 'Dashy Koto'
- Nepenthes 'Dinkum Koto'
- Nepenthes 'Dreamy Koto'
- Nepenthes 'Easeful Koto'
- Nepenthes 'Ecstatic Koto'
- Nepenthes 'Emotional Koto'
- Nepenthes 'Facile Koto'
