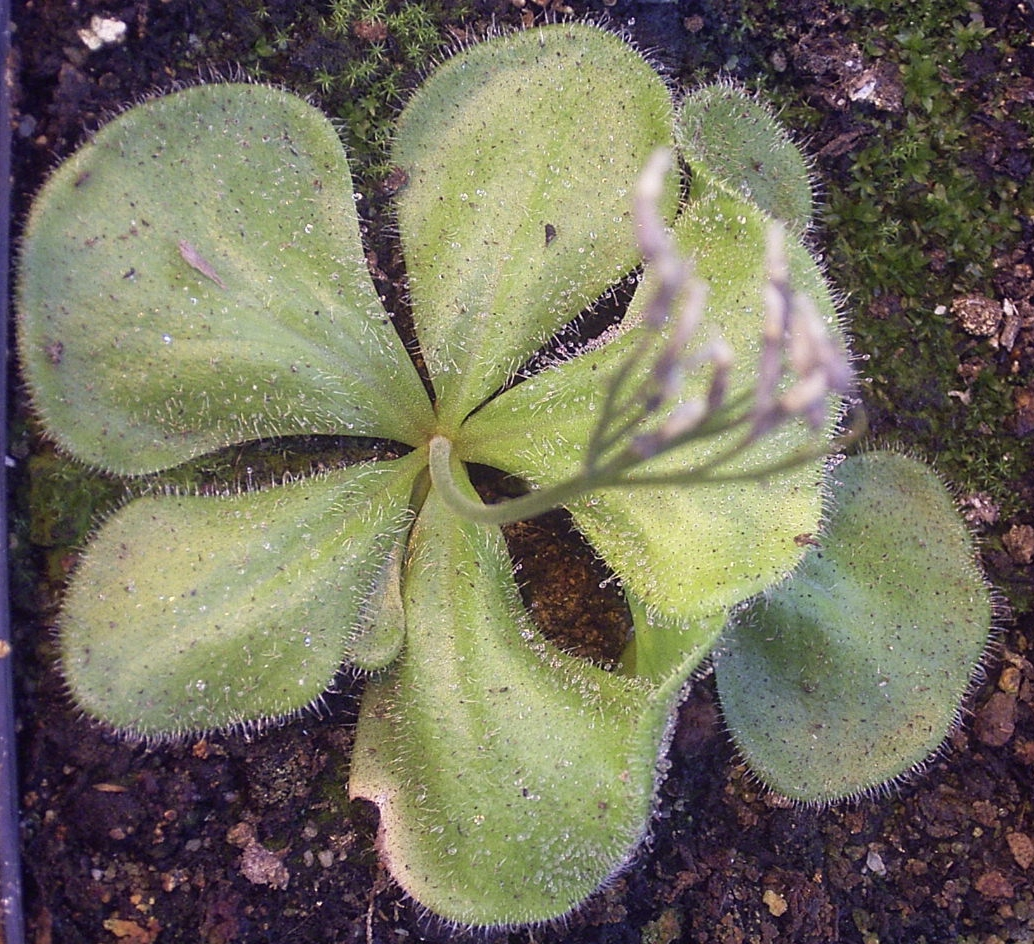
- Drosera erythrorhiza

Scientific classification
- Kingdom: Plantae
- Clade: Tracheophytes
- Clade: Angiosperms
- Clade: Eudicots
- Order: Caryophyllales
- Family: Droseraceae
- Genus: Drosera
- Subgenus: Drosera subg. Ergaleium
- Section: Drosera sect. Erythrorhiza (Planch.) Diels

Type species
- D. erythrorhiza Lindl.

Species
- Drosera aberrans; Drosera browniana; Drosera bulbosa; Drosera erythrorhiza; Drosera lowriei; Drosera macrophylla; Drosera orbiculata; Drosera praefolia; Drosera prostratoscaposa; Drosera rosulata; Drosera schmutzii; Drosera tubaestylis; Drosera whittakeri; Drosera zonaria

= Drosera sect. Erythrorhiza =

Group of carnivorous plants

Drosera sect. Erythrorhiza is a section of 14 species of tuberous species in the genus Drosera. It represents a natural group of all the rosetted tuberous Drosera. Most species are endemic to Western Australia, but D. aberrans, D. praefolia, D. schmutzii, and D. whittakeri are also found in eastern Australia.

The section was first formally described by Jules Émile Planchon in 1848 as series Erythrorhizae. Ludwig Diels reclassified the genus in his 1906 monograph of the family, recognizing this section, now spelled Erythrorhiza, within subgenus Ergaleium.

Image	Scientific name	Distribution
	Drosera aberrans (Lowrie & Carlquist) Lowrie & Conran	New South Wales, South Australia, and Victoria
	Drosera browniana Lowrie & N.G.Marchant	Western Australia.
	Drosera bulbosa Hook.	Western Australia
	Drosera erythrorhiza Lindl.	Western Australia.
	Drosera lowriei N.G.Marchant	Western Australia.
	Drosera macrophylla Lindl.	Western Australia.
	Drosera orbiculata N.G.Marchant & Lowrie	Western Australia.
	Drosera praefolia Tepper	South Australia.
	Drosera prostratoscaposa Lowrie & Carlquist	Western Australia.
	Drosera rosulata Lehm.	southwest Western Australia.
	Drosera schmutzii Lowrie & Conran	New South Wales, South Australia, and Victoria.
	Drosera tubaestylis	Western Australia
	Drosera whittakeri Planch.	South Australia and Victoria
	Drosera zonaria Planch.	south-west Western Australia

== See also ==
- List of Drosera species
