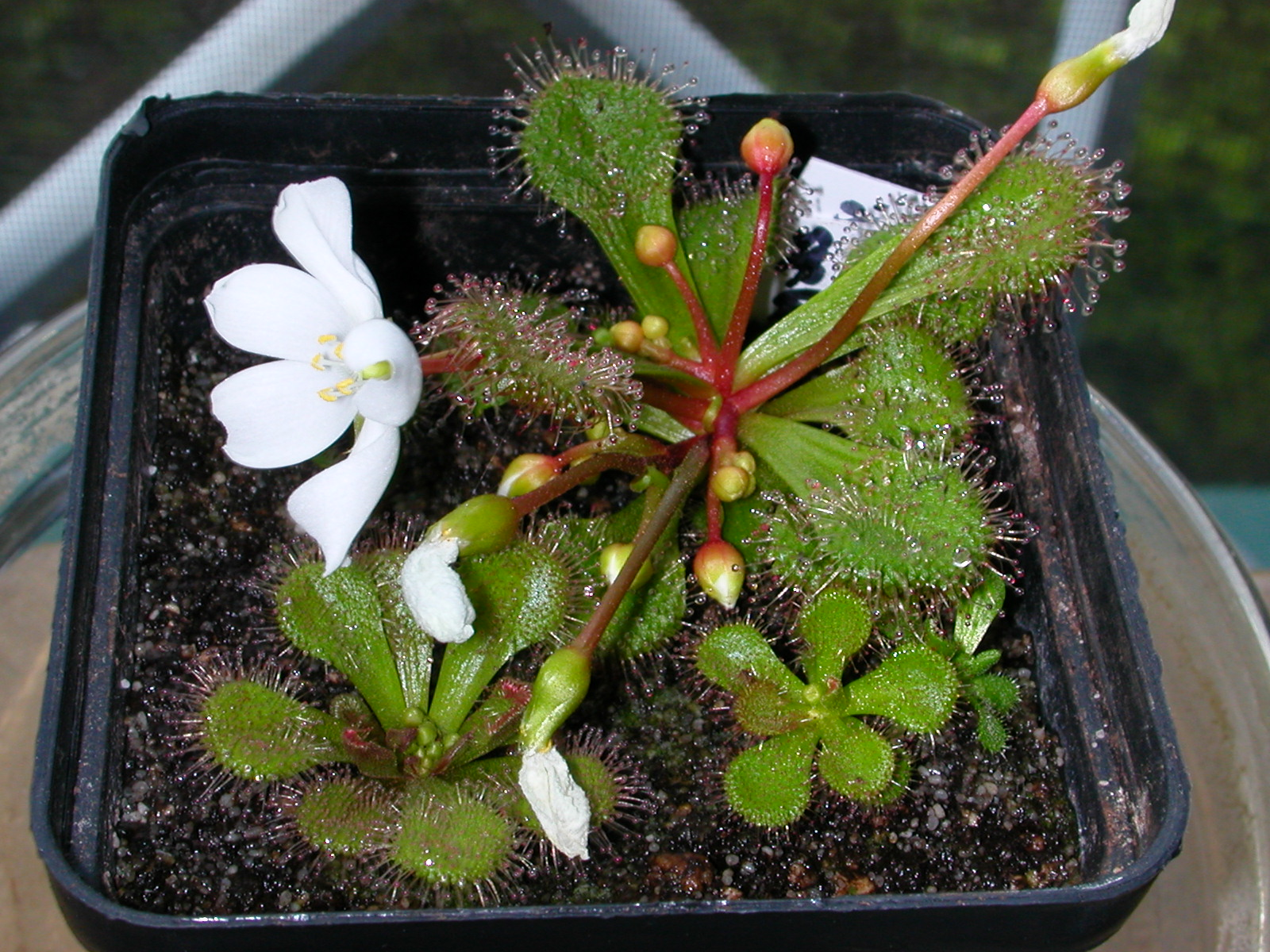

Scientific classification
- Kingdom: Plantae
- Clade: Tracheophytes
- Clade: Angiosperms
- Clade: Eudicots
- Order: Caryophyllales
- Family: Droseraceae
- Genus: Drosera
- Subgenus: Drosera subg. Ergaleium
- Section: Drosera sect. Erythrorhiza
- Species: D. aberrans

Binomial name
- Drosera aberrans (Lowrie & Carlquist) Lowrie & Conran
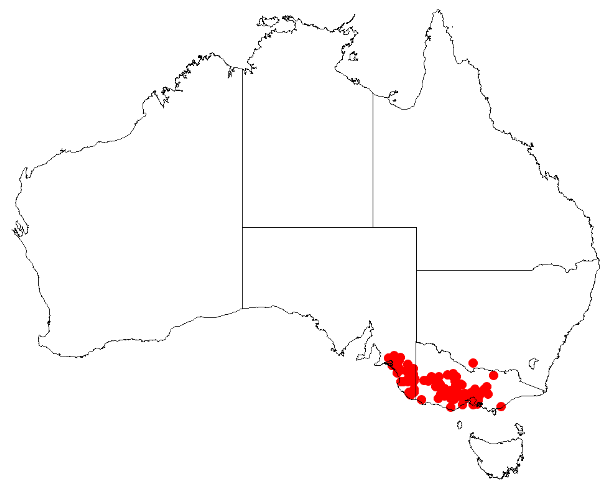
- Occurrence data from AVH

Synonyms
- D. whittakeri subsp. aberrans Lowrie & Carlquist

= Drosera aberrans =

Species of carnivorous plant

Drosera aberrans is a perennial tuberous species in the genus Drosera that is native to New South Wales, South Australia, and Victoria. It grows in a rosette 3 to 5 cm in diameter with green, orange-yellow, or red leaves. It is native to southern inland South Australia, southern and central Victoria, and one single collection from New South Wales. It grows in a variety of soils from sand to laterite gravel and limestone clay in mallee woodland, heathland, and open forests. It flowers from July to September.

== Botanical history ==
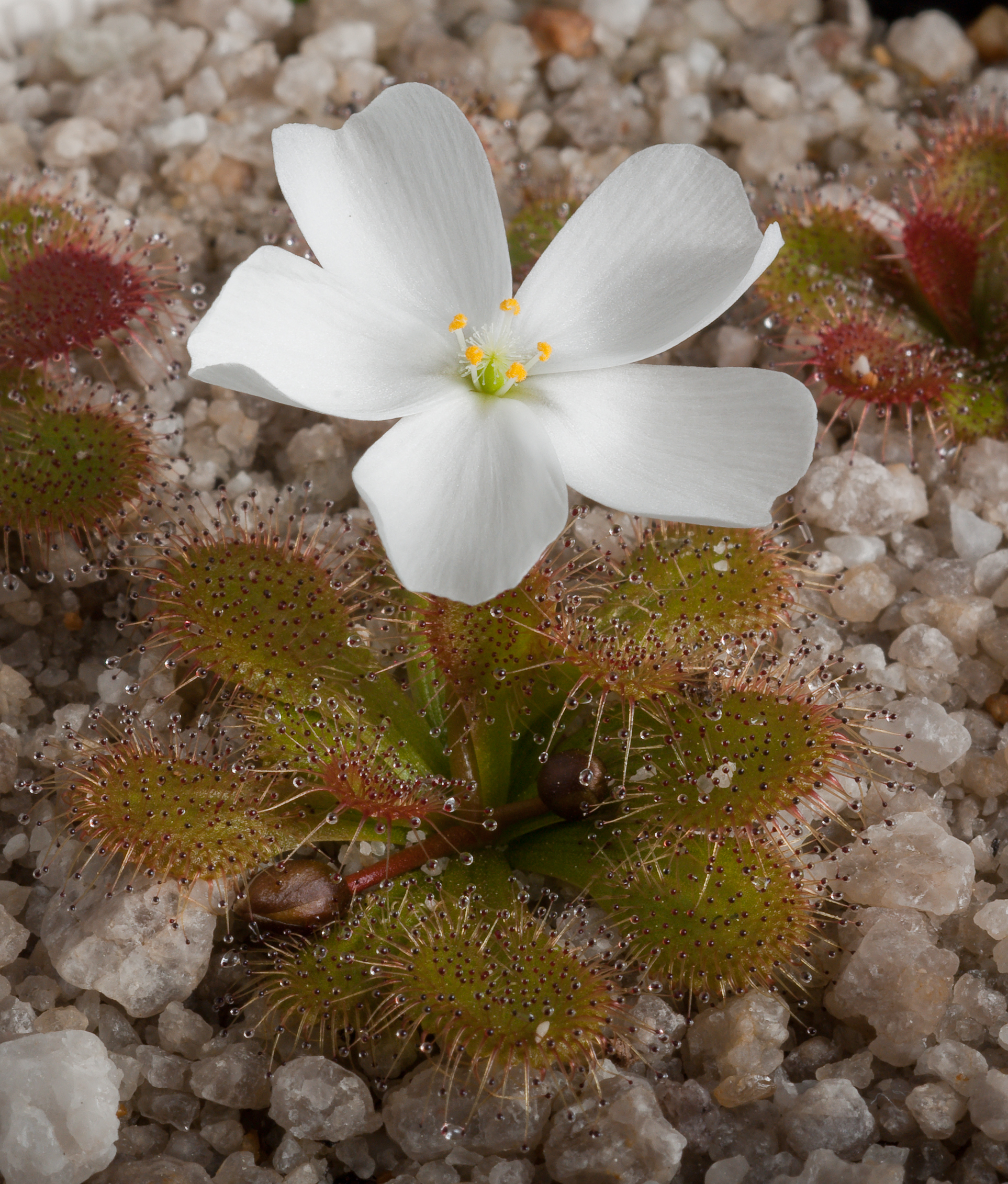
Drosera aberrans, typical form from Victoria, Australia. This is the form sold for many years by Dingley Home and Garden, later Triffid Park nurseries

It was perhaps first illustrated by Ferdinand von Mueller in 1879, which he identified as Drosera whitackeri [sic], though Allen Lowrie and John Godfrey Conran note that this could represent artistic license and may not have been drawn from an actual specimen. Lowrie and Sherwin Carlquist first formally described this taxon in 1992 as a subspecies of Drosera whittakeri. Lowrie and Conran reviewed the specimens of D. whittakeri in 2008 and elevated subsp. aberrans to species rank based on the colony-forming morphology of this species.

== See also ==
- List of Drosera species
