= The Carnivorous Plant Society =

Registered charity in the UK

- Abbreviation: CPS
- Formation: 1978; 47 years ago
- Type: Registered charity
- Legal status: Unincorporated association
- Purpose: Promote the study and conservation of carnivorous plants
- Region served: United Kingdom and worldwide
- Website: www.thecps.org.uk

The Carnivorous Plant Society (CPS), founded in May 1978 in London, is the only UK registered charity dedicated to the study and conservation of carnivorous plants. Its charitable objects are to "advance the education of the public in the study of carnivorous plants, and to promote the conservation of such plants". The Society was established by a group of amateur enthusiasts and received considerable publicity following its launch, including internationally. Within a year it had more than 100 members and by the late 1980s membership stood at around 400.

The Society is an unincorporated membership association managed by a committee of trustees and is affiliated to the Royal Horticultural Society (RHS). It publishes the biannual journal Planta Carnivora as well as a quarterly newsletter and a Guide to Growing Carnivorous Plants.

Since its founding the Society has frequently displayed plants and educational material and provided cultivation advice at a range of events including at the Natural History Museum in London, at RHS Wisley and at the Chelsea Flower Show. It funds and participates in research and conservation projects related to carnivorous plants, operates a website and the Carnivorous Plants UK Forum, and maintains a seedbank.

The current journal editor is Dr. Martin Cheek. Previous contributors to the journal include Adrian Slack, Stewart McPherson and Allen Lowrie.

The Society hosted the International Carnivorous Plant Society Conference in 2016 and the Carnivorous Plant European Exhibition and Exchange in 2011.
