= Insectivorous Plant Society =

Logo of the Insectivorous Plant Society

The Insectivorous Plant Society (食虫植物研究会, Shokuchūshokubutsu kenkyū-kai), often abbreviated as IPS, is an organization based in Chiyoda, Tokyo, Japan. Founded in November 1949, it is likely the oldest carnivorous plant society in the world. It celebrated its 50th anniversary in November 1999 at the Diamond Hotel in Tokyo. The society is named after Charles Darwin's 1875 book, Insectivorous Plants.

As of 2002, the society's chairman was Sadashi Komiya, professor emeritus of The Nippon Dental University. He was joined by the two vice chairmen, Momozo Tanaka and Yoshiyuki Sodekawa, as well as ten other committee members. At the time, total membership was around 530, the vast majority from Japan. The society already had around 300 members in the early 1970s. Five society meetings are held each year at The Nippon Dental University, usually in the months of January, April, June, October, and November.

The IPS is probably best known for its quarterly publication, The Journal of Insectivorous Plant Society, published since January 1950.
