= The $64 Tomato =

Memoir of a gardening project

- Author: William Alexander
- Subject: Gardening
- Genre: Nonfiction
- Publisher: Algonquin Books
- Publication date: 2006
- ISBN: 9781565125032
- Website: http://williamalexander.com/books.php

The $64 Tomato: How One Man Nearly Lost His Sanity, Spent a Fortune, and Endured an Existential Crisis in the Quest for the Perfect Garden is a nonfiction book by William Alexander, published in 2006. The $64 Tomato was a nominee for Quill Award in the debut author of the year category and was selected for the 2006 National Book Festival.

== Summary ==
The $64 Tomato is a memoir of Alexander's gardening project. When he and his family purchased a home with several acres in a small town in New York, he was determined to use some of the property to create a 2,000 sq ft (190 m^{2}) organic garden. Alexander documents his adventures battling pests, weeds, plant diseases, deer, and a persistent groundhog he names Superchuck. After several years of gardening, he calculates that each Brandywine tomato he grew and harvested cost him $64.

== Author ==
William Alexander is the director of technology at the Nathan S. Kline Institute for Psychiatric Research in Orangeburg, New York. He graduated from the University at Albany with a degree in English literature. He is married to Anne Mullin, an internist, and they have two children.

In addition to The $64 Tomato, Alexander has written op-eds for The New York Times.

== Reception ==
Kirkus Reviews describes it as "An amusing compilation of do's and don'ts for aspiring gardeners afflicted with hubris." Publishers Weekly says "this hilarious horticultural memoir ... manages to impart an existential lesson on the interconnectedness of nature and the fine line between nurturing and killing."

Constance Casey, writing in The New York Times Book Review, says Alexander's writing is "engaging, well paced and informative". In The New York Times Magazine, Holly Brubach recommends The $64 Tomato to prevent "Obsessive Gardening Syndrome" and says Alexander's "timing and his delivery are flawless". Anthony Doerr, in The Boston Globe, calls the book a "quick and very entertaining summer read".

=== Additional reviews ===
- The Star-Democrat (Easton, Maryland)
- Charlotte Observer
- The News and Observer (Raleigh, North Carolina)
- The Honolulu Advertiser
- Rutland Daily Herald (Vermont)
- Library Journal
- School Library Journal
- The Booklist
- The Christian Century
- The Washington Post
