= Compost Everything =

2015 book by David the Good

- Author: David the Good
- Language: English
- Subject: Gardening, composting
- Published: May 10, 2015
- Publisher: Castalia House
- Publication place: United States
- Media type: Print, e-book
- Pages: 150
- Website: thesurvivalgardener.com

Compost Everything: The Good Guide to Extreme Composting is a 2015 gardening book about extreme composting written by David the Good.
