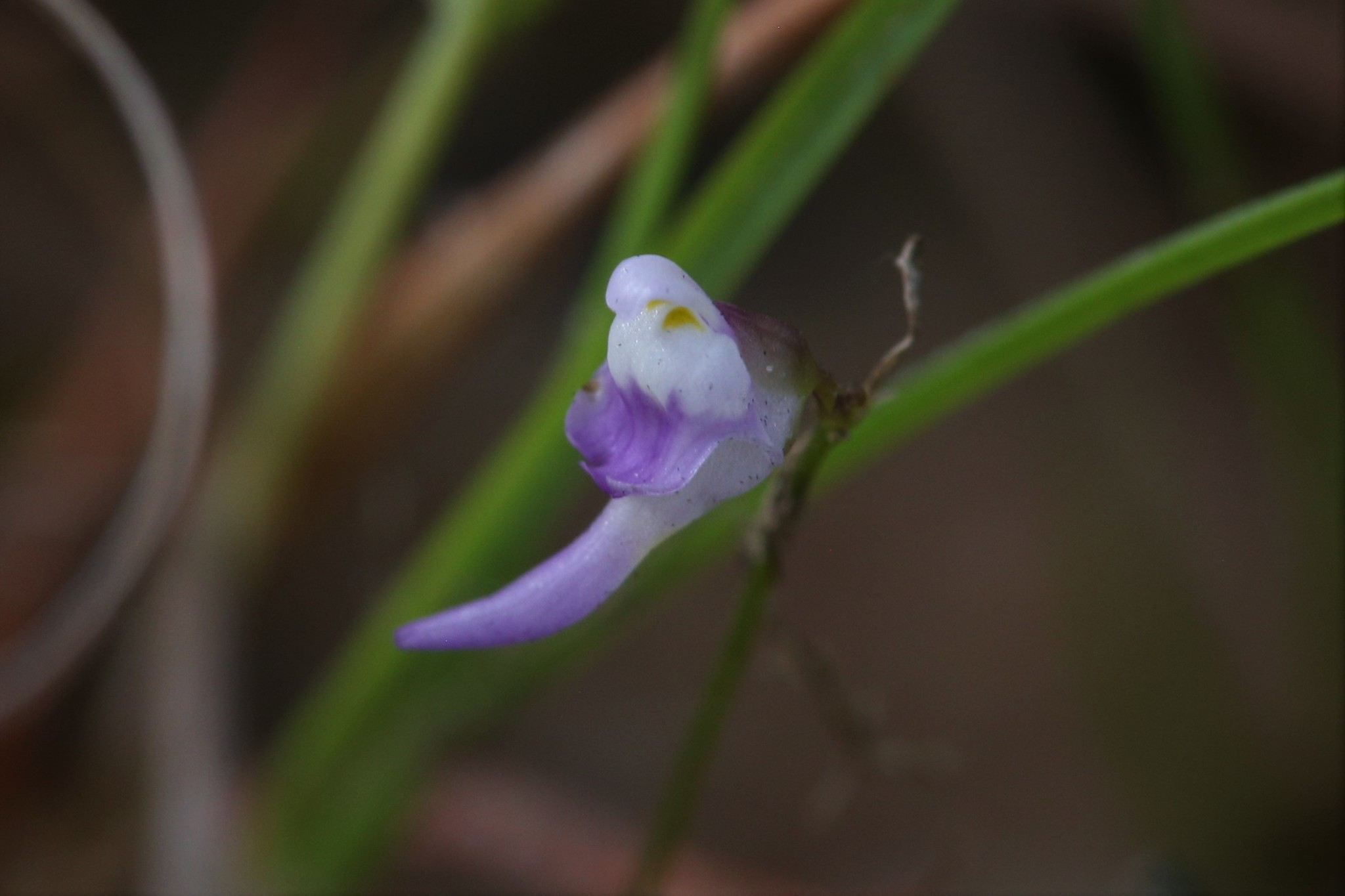
- In Australia

Conservation status
- Least Concern (IUCN 3.1)

Scientific classification
- Kingdom: Plantae
- Clade: Tracheophytes
- Clade: Angiosperms
- Clade: Eudicots
- Clade: Asterids
- Order: Lamiales
- Family: Lentibulariaceae
- Genus: Utricularia
- Species: U. geoffrayi

Binomial name
- Utricularia geoffrayi Pellegr.

Synonyms
- Utricularia ramosissima Wakabayashi

= Utricularia geoffrayi =

Species of plant

Utricularia geoffrayi is a small, probably perennial, terrestrial carnivorous plant in the family Lentibulariaceae. It is native to Australia, Cambodia, Laos, Thailand and Vietnam. It was originally published and described by François Pellegrin in 1920. It grows as a terrestrial plant among short grasses in or around rice fields at altitudes from sea level to 1,300 m (4,265 ft). It has been collected in flower between September and December.

Utricularia ramosissima from Ubon Ratchathani Province in northeastern Thailand was described as a separate species. It is regarded as a synonym of U. geoffrayi.

== See also ==
- List of Utricularia species
