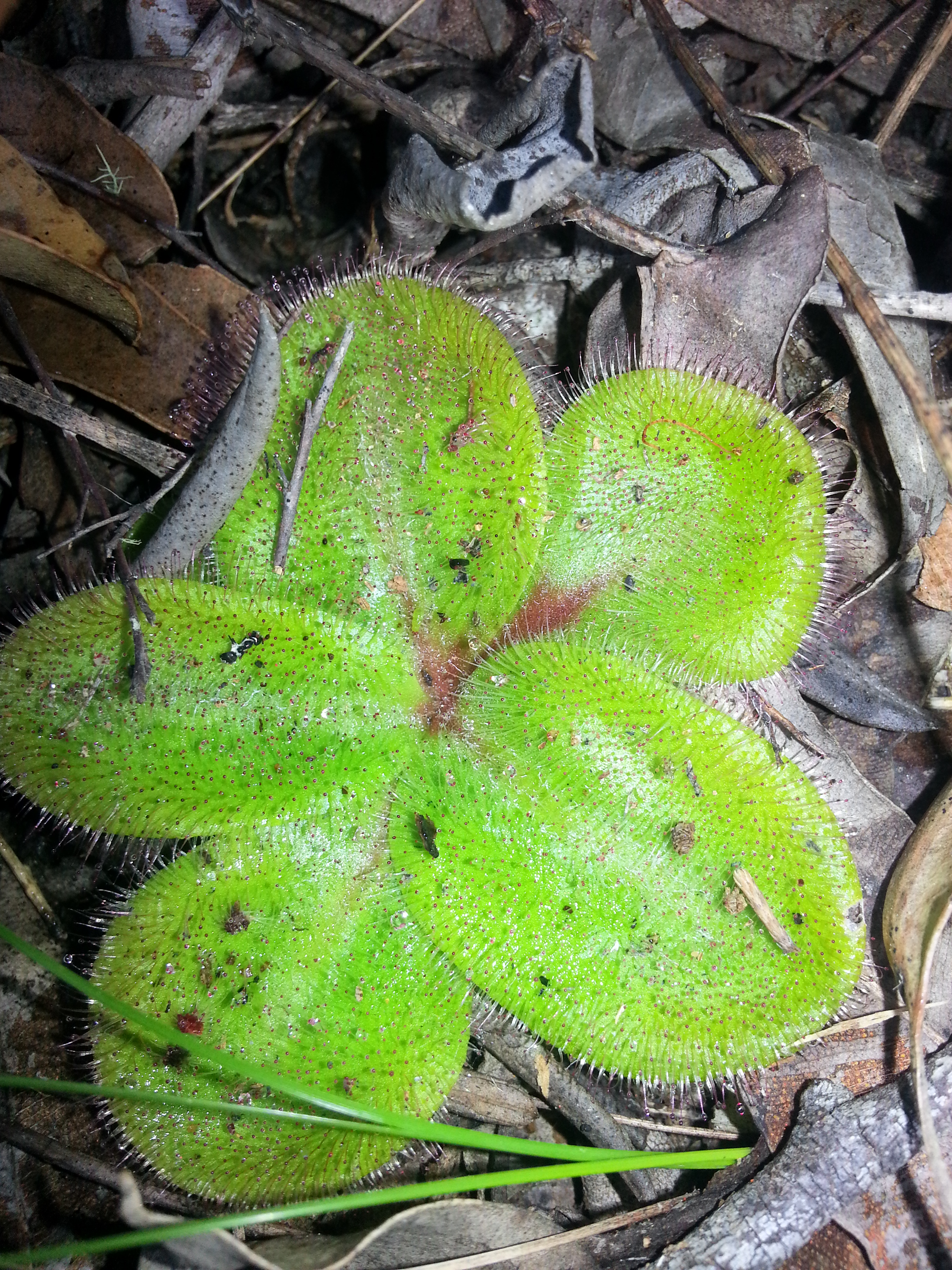

Scientific classification
- Kingdom: Plantae
- Clade: Tracheophytes
- Clade: Angiosperms
- Clade: Eudicots
- Order: Caryophyllales
- Family: Droseraceae
- Genus: Drosera
- Subgenus: Drosera subg. Ergaleium
- Section: Drosera sect. Erythrorhiza
- Species: D. macrophylla

Binomial name
- Drosera macrophylla Lindl.

Subspecies
- D. macrophylla subsp. macrophylla Lindl.; D. macrophylla subsp. monantha Lowrie & Carlquist

= Drosera macrophylla =

Species of carnivorous plant

Drosera macrophylla, the showy sundew, is a perennial tuberous species in the genus Drosera that is endemic to Western Australia. It grows in a rosette with leaves 4 cm (2 in) long and 2 cm (1 in) wide. It is a common species east of Perth. It grows in loam soils. It flowers from June to October. D. macrophylla was first described by John Lindley in his 1839 publication A sketch of the vegetation of the Swan River Colony. In 1992, Allen Lowrie and Sherwin Carlquist described a new subspecies, D. macrophylla subsp. monantha, which is distinguished from D. macrophylla subsp. macrophylla by its single-flowered or rarely biflowered inflorescences. Subspecies monantha is abundant in the Bruce Rock/Merredin region. The specific epithet macrophylla originates from Greek words makros (large) and phyllon (leaf) meaning 'large-leaved'.

== See also ==
- List of Drosera species
