= AIPC Magazine =

- Issue 7 (September 2007)
- Discipline: Botany
- Language: Italian
- Edited by: Andrea Marco Rivolta

Publication details
- History: 1998–present
- Publisher: Associazione Italiana Piante Carnivore (Italy)
- Frequency: Quarterly

Standard abbreviations
- ISO 4: AIPC Mag.

Indexing
- ISSN: 1972-8158

Links
- Journal homepage

AIPC Magazine is a quarterly Italian-language periodical and the official publication of Associazione Italiana Piante Carnivore (AIPC), a carnivorous plant society based in Rome, Italy. Typical articles include matters of horticultural interest, field reports, and plant descriptions. The periodical was established as AIPC News by Marcello Catalano in January 1998, at a time when the newly founded AIPC had only around 30 members.

AIPC News underwent a number of format changes in its early years. In its first two volumes (1998–1999), it was printed in A4 format and consisted of a colour cover and black and white body. Volumes 3 through 6 (2000–2003) were printed in the smaller A5 format and included a colour cover and insert, the rest being in black and white. From volume 7 in 2004 the magazine began printing in full colour on glossy A5 paper, and was renamed to AIPC Magazine. The magazine was released in annual volumes until 2006, when it adopted continuous issue numbering starting with a new issue 1 (March 2006). On January 1, 2006, it was registered as the society's official magazine.

Three special monographic issues have been released: issue 7 (September 2007), on the Drosera petiolaris complex; issue 14 (June 2009), on Mexican Pinguicula; and issue 18 (June 2010), on the tepuis and Gran Sabana of Venezuela. All three of these monographs have been released in English on CD. A fourth special issue was published in 2012 to cover the many carnivorous plant taxa described the previous year. This issue is also available in English.

Nepenthes rosea was formally described as a new species in the December 2014 issue of AIPC Magazine, followed by N. kongkandana in the March 2015 issue.
