= Stenopetala =

- Issue 91 (December 2004–February 2005)
- Discipline: Botany
- Language: English
- Edited by: Brian Quinn

Publication details
- History: 1982–2016
- Publisher: The New Zealand Carnivorous Plant Society (New Zealand)
- Frequency: Quarterly

Standard abbreviations
- ISO 4: Stenopetala

Indexing
- ISSN: 1175-9305
- OCLC no.: 50219329

Links
- Journal homepage

Stenopetala was a quarterly periodical and the official publication of The New Zealand Carnivorous Plant Society. Typical articles included matters of horticultural interest, field reports, literature reviews, and cultivar descriptions.

== History and profile ==
The journal was established in 1982 as The New Zealand Carnivorous Plant Society Journal (or sometimes Bulletin). It was published under the title Stenopetala since 2002. The headquarters was in Auckland. It ended publication in 2016.
