= Victorian Carnivorous Plant Society Inc. =

- Issue 82 (December 2006)
- Discipline: Botany
- Language: English
- Edited by: Stephen Fretwell

Publication details
- History: 1984–present
- Publisher: Victorian Carnivorous Plant Society (Australia)
- Frequency: Quarterly

Standard abbreviations
- ISO 4: Vic. Carniv. Plant Soc. Inc.

Indexing
- ISSN: 1033-6966
- OCLC no.: 220647414

Links
- Journal homepage

Victorian Carnivorous Plant Society Inc., formerly titled simply Victorian Carnivorous Plant Society and also known as the VCPS Journal, is a quarterly periodical and the official publication of the Victorian Carnivorous Plant Society of Australia. Typical articles include matters of horticultural interest, field reports, literature reviews, and plant descriptions. The journal was established in early 1984, a year after the society itself was founded. Early in its history, issues were grouped into volumes; this system was later abandoned in favour of continuous issue numbering. The journal totals around 80 pages annually.
