= Dionée =

- Issue 79 (autumn 2010)
- Discipline: Botany
- Language: French
- Edited by: Gilles Deparis

Publication details
- History: 1984–present
- Publisher: Association Francophone des Amateurs de Plantes Carnivores (France)
- Frequency: Quarterly

Standard abbreviations
- ISO 4: Dionée

Indexing
- ISSN: 1169-9094
- OCLC no.: 473455065

Links
- Journal homepage

Dionée is a quarterly French-language periodical and the official publication of Association Francophone des Amateurs de Plantes Carnivores,^{[nb a]} a carnivorous plant society based in France. Typical articles include matters of horticultural interest, field reports, and scientific studies. The Association was established in 1983 and the magazine was founded in 1984 which has been published in full colour from issue 68 (Winter 2007) onwards. It is printed in A5 format and totals around 160 pages annually. New issues are usually released in the months of March, June, September, and December.

== Notes ==
a. Originally called "Association Française d'Amateurs de Plantes Carnivores".
