= Drosera rosulata =

Conservation status
- Least Concern (IUCN 3.1)

Scientific classification
- Kingdom: Plantae
- Clade: Tracheophytes
- Clade: Angiosperms
- Clade: Eudicots
- Order: Caryophyllales
- Family: Droseraceae
- Genus: Drosera
- Subgenus: Drosera subg. Ergaleium
- Section: Drosera sect. Erythrorhiza
- Species: D. rosulata

Binomial name
- Drosera rosulata Lehm.

Synonyms
- Sondera rosulata (Lehm.) Chrtek & Slavíková; Drosera rosulata Behr

Species of carnivorous plant

Drosera rosulata is a species of carnivorous plant in the family Droseraceae. It is a perennial that is endemic to southwest Western Australia. It is a tuberous plant that has a rosette about 7 cm in diameter. It grows in sandy or clay soils on the margins of swamps. Its white flowers emerge in April to June. D. rosulata was first formally described by Johann Georg Christian Lehmann in 1844.

== See also ==
- List of Drosera species
