= Trifid (magazine) =

- Volume 2009, issue 1
- Discipline: Botany
- Language: Czech
- Edited by: Zdeněk Žáček

Publication details
- Former name: Amatérské Pěstování Masožravých Rostlin
- History: 1990–present
- Publisher: Darwiniana (Czech Republic)
- Frequency: Quarterly

Standard abbreviations
- ISO 4: Trifid

Indexing
- ISSN: 1214-4134
- OCLC no.: 320698184

Links
- Journal homepage

Trifid is a quarterly Czech-language periodical and the official publication of Darwiniana, a carnivorous plant society based in the Czech Republic. Typical articles include matters of horticultural interest, field reports, and scientific studies. The journal was established in 1990 as Amatérské Pěstování Masožravých Rostlin (Amateur Growing of Carnivorous Plants) and obtained its current title in 1996. It is published in B5 format, with each issue numbering around 36 pages, of which 24 are in colour.
