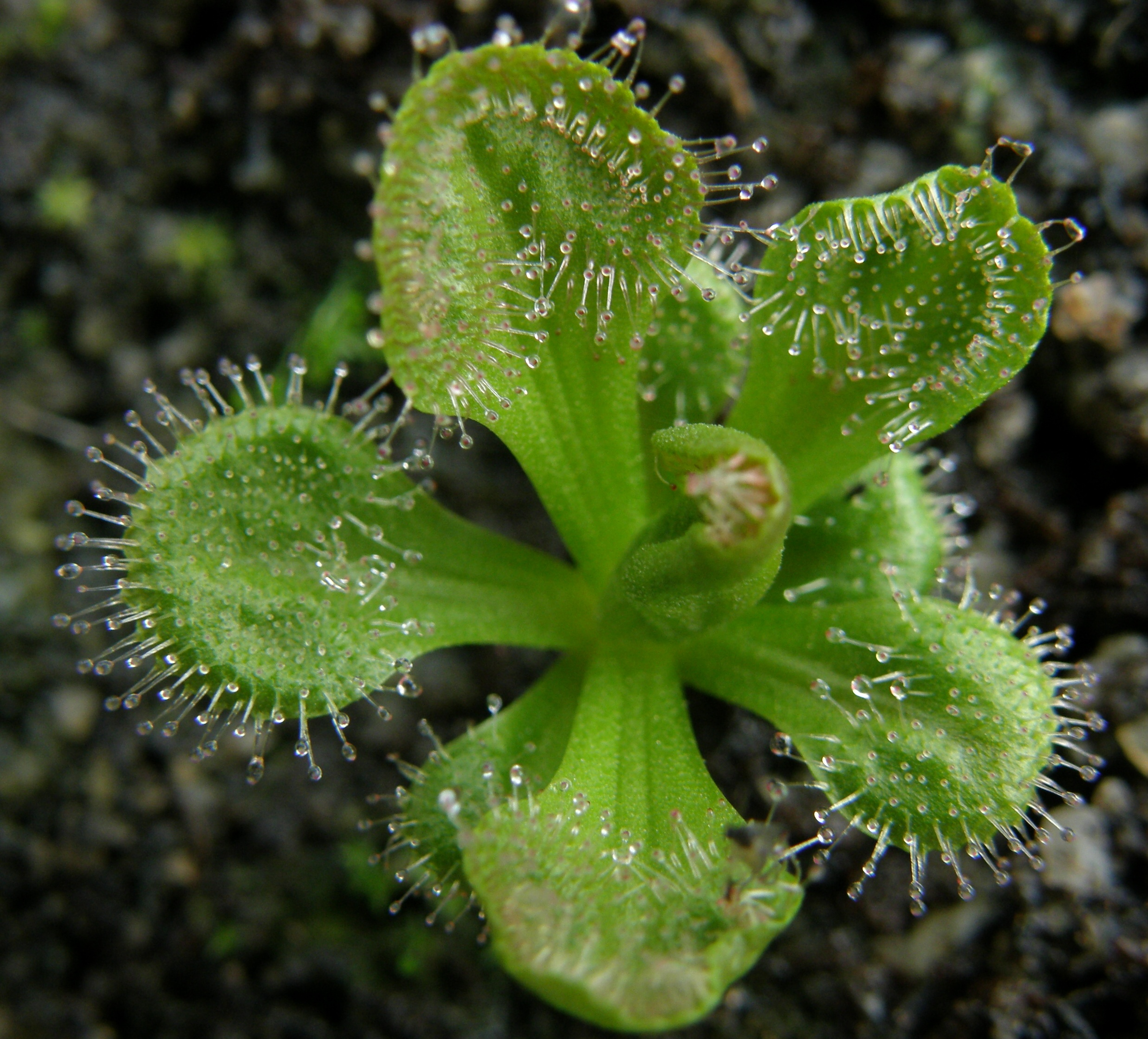

Scientific classification
- Kingdom: Plantae
- Clade: Tracheophytes
- Clade: Angiosperms
- Clade: Eudicots
- Order: Caryophyllales
- Family: Droseraceae
- Genus: Drosera
- Subgenus: Drosera subg. Ergaleium
- Section: Drosera sect. Erythrorhiza
- Species: D. whittakeri

Binomial name
- Drosera whittakeri Planch.

= Drosera whittakeri =

Species of carnivorous plant

Drosera whittakeri (scented sundew, Whittaker's sundew) is a sundew that is native to South Australia and Victoria.

== Description ==
Plants are 4 to 8 cm in diameter, with broadly spathulate leaves arranged in a rosette. These may be green, orange-yellow or red in colour and are 10 to 15 mm long and 9 to 13 mm wide. Up to 20 white flowers are produced overall, with multiple flowers open at any one time. The main flowering period is May to November in its native range, but flowers may appear throughout the year.

== Taxonomy ==
The species was formally described by Jules Émile Planchon in Annales des Sciences Naturelles in 1848 as Drosera "Whittakerii". The species was named after Derbyshire botanist Joseph Whittaker who collected some 300 plant specimens from Adelaide and the southern Mount Lofty Ranges to Encounter Bay between 1839 and 1840. Two subspecies are recognised by some authorities:

- Drosera whittakeri subsp. aberrans Lowrie & Carlquist
- Drosera whittakeri Planch. subsp. whittakeri

In 2008, Allen Lowrie and John G. Conran elevated the former to species status, as Drosera aberrans. The authors also argue that Drosera praefolia should be considered a distinct species, rather than a synonym of D. whittakeri.

== Gallery ==
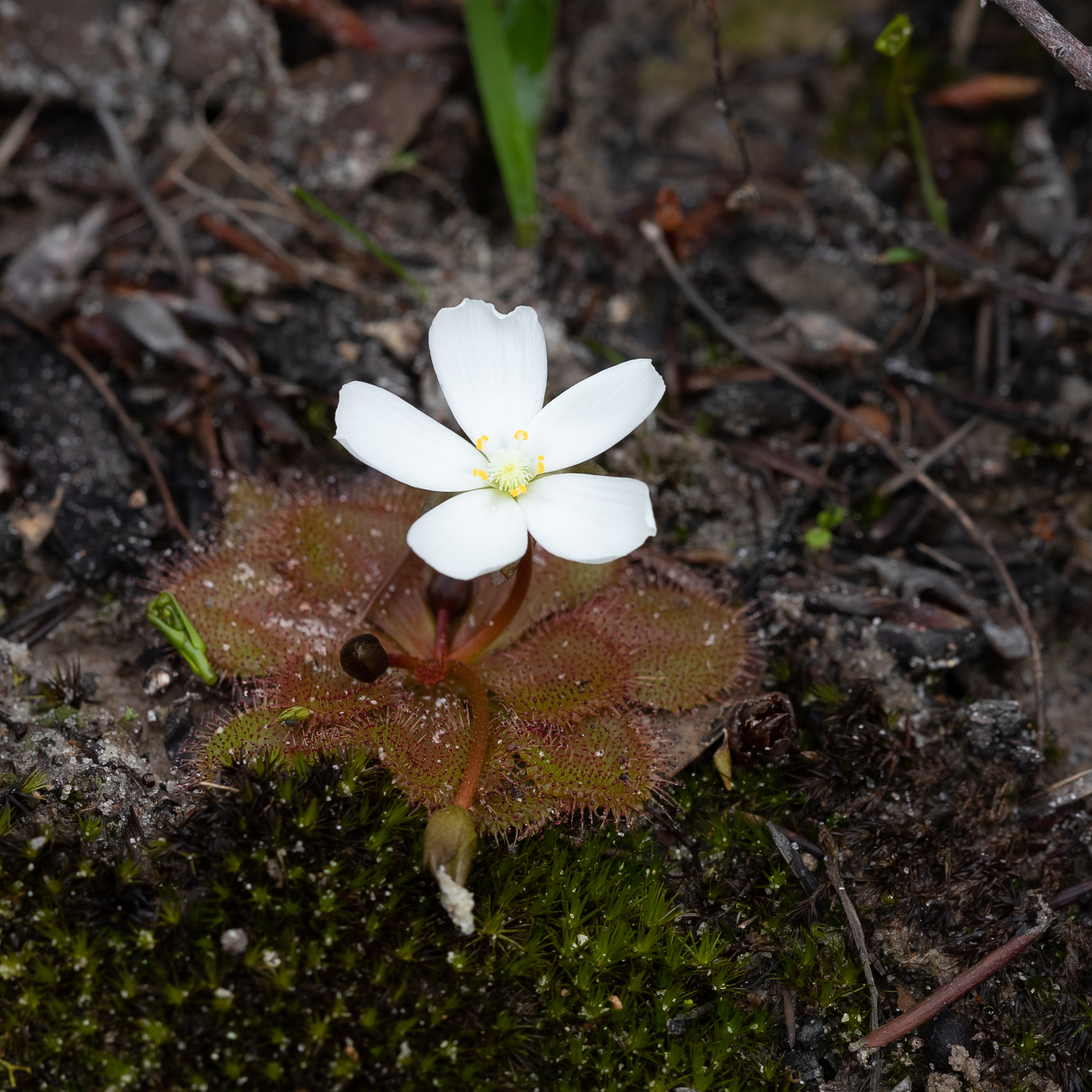
Drosera whittakeri showing inflorescence.

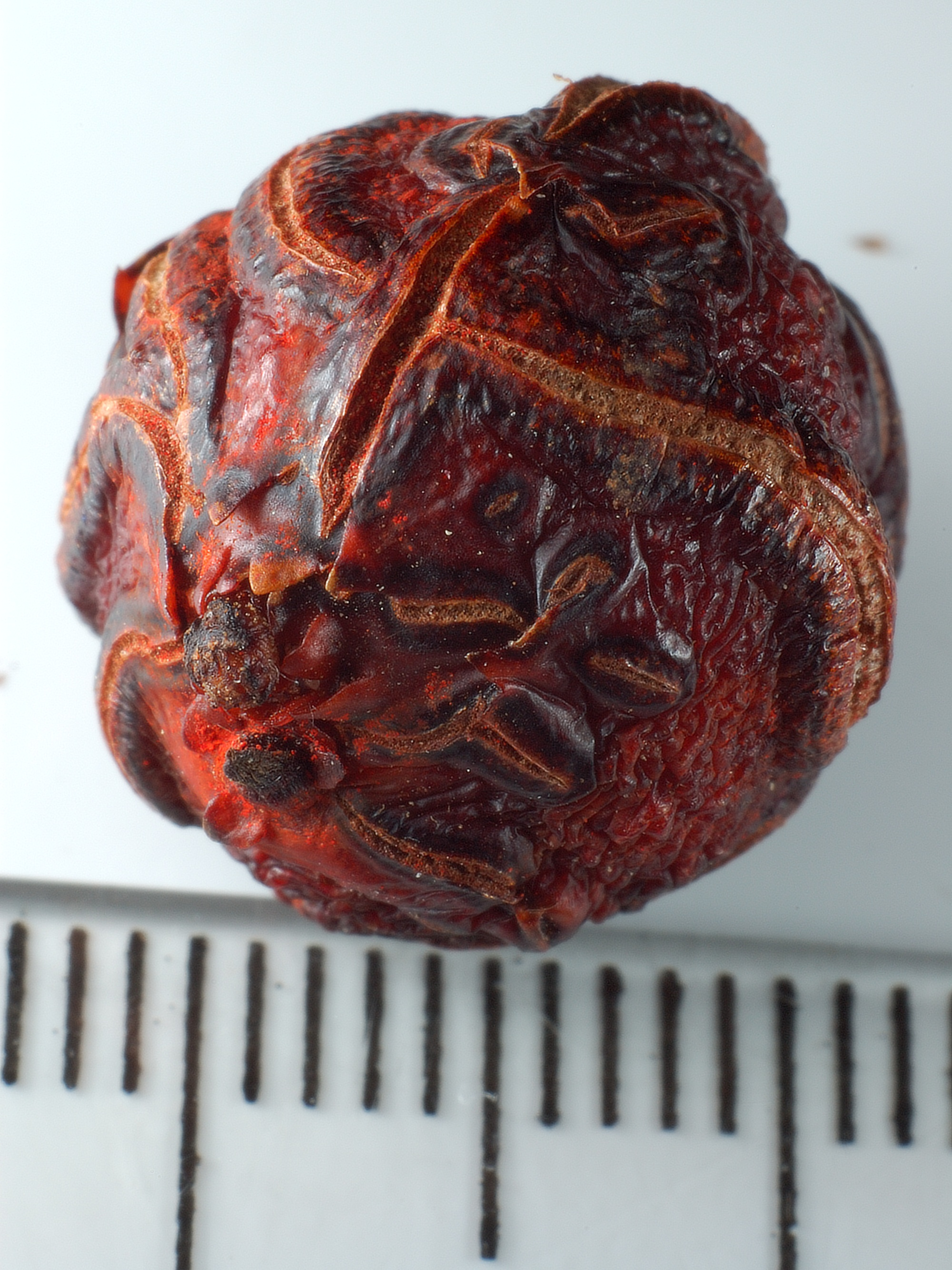
Underground tuber of Drosera whittakeri
