= Planta Carnivora =

- Discipline: Botany
- Language: English

Publication details
- History: 1980–present
- Publisher: The Carnivorous Plant Society (United Kingdom)
- Frequency: Biannual

Standard abbreviations
- ISO 4: Planta Carniv.

Indexing
- ISSN: 0260-440X
- OCLC no.: 13024012

Links
- Journal homepage

Planta Carnivora is a biannual periodical and the official publication of The Carnivorous Plant Society of the United Kingdom. Typical articles include matters of horticultural interest, field reports, and news of plant discoveries. The journal was established in 1980 and was called The Carnivorous Plant Society Journal until 2009; the following year it was combined with the society's newsletter to form Planta Carnivora. Issues are published in spring and autumn.

== Taxon names ==
The nomen novum (replacement name) Nepenthes sumagaya was published in the Autumn 2014 issue of Planta Carnivora. Other taxa formally established in the magazine include the hybrids Drosera × eloisiana, Sarracenia × miniata, Sarracenia × slackii, and Sarracenia × soperi, as well as the sections Nepenthes sect. Alatae, Nepenthes sect. Micramphorae, and Nepenthes sect. Villosae.

The following cultivar names were first published in this magazine: Cephalotus 'Eden Black', Drosera 'Tamlin', Sarracenia 'Blood Sweat & Tears', Sarracenia 'Langford Williams', Sarracenia 'Melissa Mazur', Sarracenia 'Victoria Morley', and Utricularia 'Betty's Bay'.
