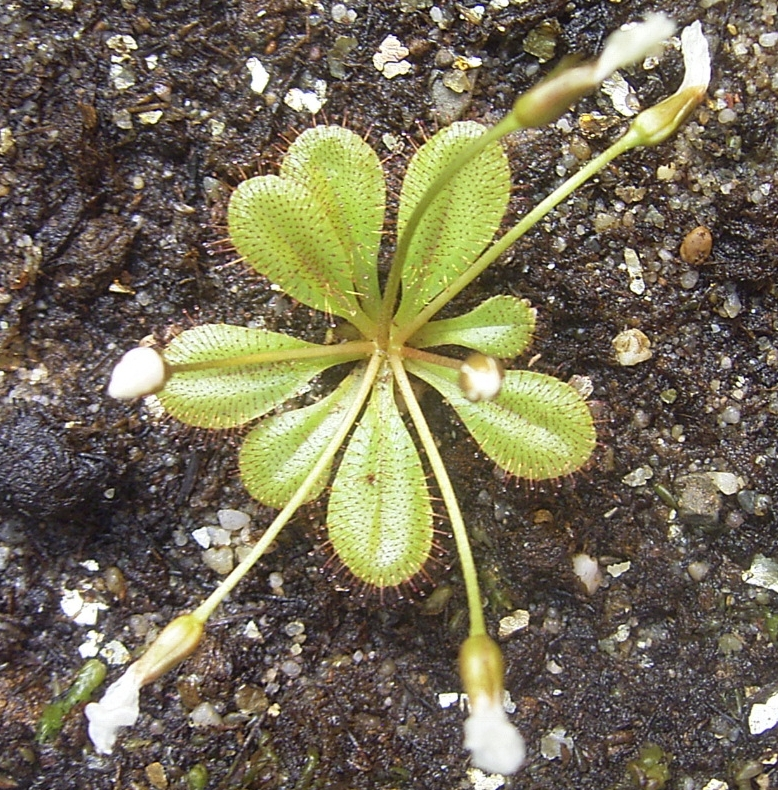

Scientific classification
- Kingdom: Plantae
- Clade: Tracheophytes
- Clade: Angiosperms
- Clade: Eudicots
- Order: Caryophyllales
- Family: Droseraceae
- Genus: Drosera
- Subgenus: Drosera subg. Ergaleium
- Section: Drosera sect. Erythrorhiza
- Species: D. bulbosa

Binomial name
- Drosera bulbosa Hook.

Subspecies
- D. b. subsp. bulbosa Hook.; D. b. subsp. major (Diels) N.Marchant & Lowrie

= Drosera bulbosa =

Species of carnivorous plant

Drosera bulbosa, the red-leaved sundew, is a perennial tuberous species in the genus Drosera that is endemic to Western Australia. It grows in a rosette and produces white flowers which emerge from April to June. D. bulbosa was first formally described by William Jackson Hooker in 1841.

== See also ==
- List of Drosera species
