= List of Drosera species =

The following list of Drosera species includes all species and nothospecies (named naturally occurring hybrids) within the genus Drosera (sundews) that are accepted as of October 2024. This list contains 274 species and nothospecies.

Species	Authority	Year^{a}	Vernacular name	Distribution	Image
Drosera aberrans	(Lowrie & Carlquist) Lowrie & Conran	2008			
Drosera acaulis	L.f.	1781	Stemless sundew	South Africa	
Drosera adelae	F.Muell.	1864	Adelaide sundew, lance-leaved sundew		
Drosera admirabilis	Debbert	1987		South Africa	
Drosera affinis	Welw. ex Oliv.	1871		African tropics	
Drosera alba	Phillips	1913		South Africa	
Drosera albonotata	A.S.Rob., A.T.Cross, Meisterl & A.Fleischm.	2018		Australia (Western Australia)	
Drosera aliciae	Raym.-Hamet	1905	Alice sundew	South Africa	
Drosera allantostigma	(N.G.Marchant & Lowrie) Lowrie & Conran	2007			
Drosera amazonica	Rivadavia, A.Fleischm. & Vicent.	2009		Brazil	
Drosera andersoniana	W.Fitzg. ex Ewart & Jean White	1909	Sturdy sundew		
Drosera androsacea	Diels	1904	Cone sundew		
Drosera anglica	Huds.	1778	English sundew, great sundew	circumboreal North America, Europe, and Asia	
Drosera aquatica	Lowrie	1834		Australia (Western Australia)	
Drosera arachnoides	Rakotoar. & A.Fleischm.	2020		Madagascar	
Drosera arcturi	Hook.	1834			
Drosera arenicola	Steyerm.	1952		Venezuela	
Drosera ascendens	A.St.-Hil.	1826		Brazil	
Drosera atrata	T.Krueger, A.Fleischm. & Bourke	2023		Australia (Western Australia)	
Drosera atrostyla	Debbert	1991		South Africa (Cape Provinces)	
Drosera aurantiaca	Lowrie	2013		Australia (Western Australia, Northern Territory)	
Drosera auriculata	Backh. ex Planch.	1848		Australia and New Zealand	
Drosera australis	(N.G.Marchant & Lowrie) Lowrie & Conran	2013		Australia	
Drosera × badgerupii	Cheek	1993		Australia	
Drosera × badgingarra	Lowrie & Conran	2013		Australia	
Drosera banksii	R.Br. ex DC.	1824	Banks' sundew	Australia and New Guinea	
Drosera barbigera	Planch.	1848		Australia	
Drosera barrettiorum	Lowrie	2013		Australia	
Drosera basifolia	(N.G.Marchant & Lowrie) Lowrie	2013		Australia	
Drosera bequaertii	Taton	1945		Angola and the Democratic Republic of the Congo	
Drosera bicolor	Lowrie & Carlquist	1992		Australia	
Drosera biflora	Willd. ex Roem. & Schult.	1820		Venezuela	
Drosera binata	Labill.	1804	Fork-leaved sundew	Australia and New Zealand	
Drosera bindoon	Lowrie	2013		Australia	
Drosera × bockowskii	Scholl	2022		US (Florida)	
Drosera brevicornis	Lowrie	1996		Australia	
Drosera brevifolia	Pursh	1814	Dwarf sundew, small sundew, red sundew	North America, Central America, and South America	
Drosera broomensis	Lowrie	1996		Australia	
Drosera browniana	Lowrie & N.G.Marchant	1992		Australia	
Drosera bulbigena	Morrison	1903	Midget sundew	Australia	
Drosera bulbosa	Hook.	1841	Red-leaved sundew	Australia	
Drosera burkeana	Planch.	1848		African tropics	
Drosera burmanni	Vahl	1794	Tropical sundew	Australia and Southeast Asia	
Drosera buubugujin	Michael T. Mathieson	2020		Australia	
Drosera caduca	Lowrie	1996		Australia	
Drosera × californica	Cheek	1993		US	
Drosera callistos	N.G.Marchant & Lowrie	1992		Australia	
Drosera calycina	Planch.	1848		Australia	
Drosera camporupestris	Rivadavia	2003		Brazil	
Drosera capensis	L.	1753	Cape sundew	South Africa	
Drosera capillaris	Poir.	1804	Pink sundew, spathulate-leaved sundew	North America, Central America, and South America	
Drosera × carbarup	Lowrie & Conran	2013		Australia	
Drosera cayennensis	Sagot ex Diels	1906		Brazil, French Guiana, and Venezuela	
Drosera cendeensis	Tamayo & Croizat	1949		Venezuela	
Drosera chimaera	Gonella & Rivadavia	2014		Brazil	
Drosera chrysolepis	Taub.	1893		Brazil and Peru	
Drosera cistiflora	L.	1760		South Africa	
Drosera citrina	Lowrie & Carlquist	1992		Australia	
Drosera closterostigma	N.G.Marchant & Lowrie	1992		Australia	
Drosera coalara	Lowrie & Conran	2013		Australia	
Drosera coccipetala	Debbert	2002		South Africa	
Drosera collina	(N.G.Marchant & Lowrie) Lowrie	2013		Australia	
Drosera collinsiae	N.E.Br. ex Burtt Davy	1924		South Africa	
Drosera communis	A.St.-Hil.	1824		Brazil, Colombia, Paraguay, and Venezuela	
Drosera condor	P. Gonella, A. Fleischmann, F. Rivadavia, D. Neill, & P. Sano	2016		Peru and Ecuador	
Drosera coomallo	Lowrie & Conran	2013		Australia	
Drosera × corinthiaca	R.A.Gibson & E.Green	1999		South Africa	
Drosera cucullata	Lowrie	2013		Australia	
Drosera cuneifolia	L.f.	1781		South Africa	
Drosera curvipes	Planch.	1848		South Africa, Eswatini	
Drosera darwinensis	Lowrie	1996		Australia	
Drosera depauperata	Lowrie & Conran	2013		Australia	
Drosera derbyensis	Lowrie	1996		Australia	
Drosera dichrosepala	Turcz.	1854	Rusty sundew	Australia	
Drosera dielsiana	Exell & J.R.Laundon	1956		Southern Africa	
Drosera dilatatopetiolaris	K.Kondo	1984		Australia	
Drosera drummondii	Planch.	1848		Australia	
Drosera echinoblastus	N.G.Marchant & Lowrie	1992		Australia	
Drosera × eloisiana	T.S.Bailey	2015		Europe, North America	
Drosera elongata	Exell & J.R.Laundon	1955		Angola	
Drosera eneabba	N.G.Marchant & Lowrie	1992		Australia	
Drosera enodes	N.G.Marchant & Lowrie	1992		Australia	
Drosera eremaea	(N.G.Marchant & Lowrie) Lowrie & Conran	2013		Australia	
Drosera ericgreenii	A.Fleischm., R.P.Gibson & Rivadavia	2008		South Africa	
Drosera erythrogyne	N.G.Marchant & Lowrie	1992		Australia	
Drosera erythrorhiza	Lindl.	1839	Red ink sundew	Australia	
Drosera esmeraldae	(Steyerm.) Maguire & Wurdack	1957		Colombia, Venezuela	
Drosera esperensis	Lowrie	2013		Australia	
Drosera esterhuyseniae	(Salter) Debbert	1991		South Africa	
Drosera falconeri	Tsang ex K.Kondo	1984		Australia	
Drosera felix	Steyerm. & L.B.Sm.	1974		Venezuela	
Drosera filiformis	Raf.	1808	Thread-leaved sundew	North America	
Drosera fimbriata	DeBuhr	1975	Manypeaks sundew	Australia	
Drosera finlaysoniana	Wall. ex Arn.	1837		Australia	
Drosera flexicaulis	Welw. ex Oliv.	1871		Democratic Republic of the Congo, Angola	
Drosera × fontinalis	Rivadavia	2009		Brazil	
Drosera fragrans	Lowrie	2013		Australia	
Drosera fulva	Planch.	1848		Australia	
Drosera geniculata	(N.G.Marchant & Lowrie) Lowrie	2013		Australia	
Drosera gibsonii	P.Mann	2007		Australia	
Drosera gigantea	Lindl.	1839	Giant sundew	Australia	
Drosera glabripes	(Harv. ex Planch.) Stein	1886		South Africa	
Drosera glabriscapa	Lowrie	2013		Australia	
Drosera glanduligera	Lehm.	1844	Pimpernel sundew	Australia	
Drosera gracilis	Hook.f. ex Planch.	1848		New Guinea, Australia	
Drosera graminifolia	A.St.-Hil.	1824		Brazil	
Drosera graniticola	N.G.Marchant	1982		Australia	
Drosera grantsaui	Rivadavia	2003		Brazil	
Drosera graomogolensis	T.R.S.Silva	1997		Brazil	
Drosera grievei	Lowrie & N.G.Marchant	1992		Australia	
Drosera gunniana	(Planch.) de Salas	2018		Australia	
Drosera hamiltonii	C.R.P.Andrews	1903	Rosy sundew	Australia	
Drosera hartmeyerorum	Schlauer	2001		Australia	
Drosera helodes	N.G.Marchant & Lowrie	1992		Australia	
Drosera heterophylla	Lindl.	1839	Swamp rainbow	Australia	
Drosera hilaris	Cham. & Schltdl.	1826		South Africa	
Drosera hirsuta	Lowrie & Conran	2013		Australia	
Drosera hirtella	A.St.-Hil.	1824		Brazil	
Drosera hirticalyx	R.Duno & Culham	1995		Venezuela	
Drosera hookeri	R.P.Gibson, B.J.Conn & Conran	2010		Australia	
Drosera hortiorum	T.Krueger & Bourke	2023		Australia	
Drosera huegelii	Endl.	1837	Bold sundew	Australia	
Drosera humbertii	Exell & J.R.Laundon	1956		Madagascar	
Drosera humilis	Planch.	1848		Australia	
Drosera × hybrida	Macfarl.	1899		USA	
Drosera hyperostigma	N.G.Marchant & Lowrie	1992		Australia	
Drosera indica	L.	1753	Indian sundew	Tropical Africa, Asia, and Australia	
Drosera indumenta	Lowrie & Conran	2013		Australia	
Drosera intermedia	Hayne	1800	Oblong-leaved sundew, spoonleaf sundew	temperate Europe, North America, South America	
Drosera intricata	Planch.	1848		Australia	
Drosera kaieteurensis	Brumm.-Ding.	1955		Guyana, Trinidad and Tobago, Venezuela	
Drosera katangensis	Taton	1945		Democratic Republic of the Congo	
Drosera kenneallyi	Lowrie	1996		Australia	
Drosera koikyennuruff	T.Krueger & A.S.Rob.	2023		Australia	
Drosera lanata	K.Kondo	1984		Australia	
Drosera lasiantha	Lowrie & Carlquist	1992		Australia	
Drosera latifolia	(Eichler) Gonella & Rivadavia	2014		Brazil	
Drosera × legrandii	Lowrie & Conran	2013		Australia	
Drosera leioblastus	N.G.Marchant & Lowrie	1992		Australia	
Drosera leucoblasta	Benth.	1864	Wheel sundew	Australia	
Drosera leucostigma	(N.G.Marchant & Lowrie) Lowrie & Conran	2007		Australia	
Drosera linearis	Goldie	1822	Slenderleaf sundew	North America	
Drosera × linglica	Kusak. ex R.Gauthier & Gervai	1999		North America	
Drosera lowriei	N.G.Marchant	1992		Australia	
Drosera lunata	Buch.-Ham. ex DC.	1824		Asia, Australia	
Drosera lutescens	(A.St.-Hil.) Gonella, Rivadavia & A.Fleischm.	2022		Bolivia, Brazil	
Drosera maanyaa-gooljoo	A.Fleischm. & T.Krueger	2023		Australia	
Drosera macrantha	Endl.	1837	Bridal rainbow	Australia	
Drosera macropetala	(Diels) T.Krueger & A.Fleischm.	2023		Australia	
Drosera macrophylla	Lindl.	1839	Showy sundew	Australia	
Drosera madagascariensis	DC.	1824		Africa	
Drosera magna	(N.G.Marchant & Lowrie) Lowrie	2013		Australia	
Drosera magnifica		2015		Brazil	
Drosera major	(Diels) Lowrie	2013		Australia	
Drosera mannii	Cheek	1990		Australia	
Drosera marchantii	DeBuhr	1975		Australia	
Drosera margaritacea	T.Krueger & A.Fleischm.	2021		Australia	
Drosera menziesii	R.Br. ex DC.	1824	Pink rainbow	Australia	
Drosera meristocaulis	Maguire & Wurdack	1957		Venezuela	
Drosera micra	Lowrie & Conran	2013		Australia	
Drosera micrantha	Lehm.	1844		Australia	
Drosera microphylla	Endl.	1837	Golden rainbow	Australia	
Drosera microscapa	Debbert	1992		Australia	
Drosera miniata	Diels	1904	Orange sundew	Australia	
Drosera minutiflora	Planch.	1848		Australia	
Drosera modesta	Diels	1904	Modest rainbow	Australia	
Drosera monantha	(Lowrie & Carlquist) Lowrie	2013		Australia	
Drosera montana	A.St.-Hil.	1824		Argentina, Brazil, Paraguay, Venezuela	
Drosera monticola	(Lowrie & N.G.Marchant) Lowrie	1992		Australia	
Drosera moorei	(Diels) Lowrie	1999		Australia	
Drosera murfetii	(Lowrie) Lowrie	2014		Australia	
Drosera myriantha	Planch.	1848	Star rainbow, starry sundew	Australia	
Drosera nana	Lowrie	2013		Australia	
Drosera natalensis	Diels	1906		Madagascar, Mozambique, South Africa	
Drosera neesii	Lehm.	1844	Jewel rainbow	Australia	
Drosera neocaledonica	Raym.-Hamet	1906		New Caledonia	
Drosera nidiformis	Debbert	1991		South Africa	
Drosera nitidula	Planch.	1848	Shining sundew	Australia	
Drosera nivea	Lowrie & Carlquist	1992		Australia	
Drosera oblanceolata	Y.Z.Ruan	1981		China	
Drosera × obovata	Mert. & W.D.J.Koch	1826		Northern Hemisphere	
Drosera occidentalis	Morrison	1912	Western sundew	Australia	
Drosera omissa	Diels	1906	Bright sundew	Australia	
Drosera orbiculata	N.G.Marchant & Lowrie	1992		Australia	
Drosera ordensis	Lowrie	1994		Australia	
Drosera oreopodion	N.G.Marchant & Lowrie	1992		Australia	
Drosera paleacea	DC.	1824	Dwarf sundew	Australia	
Drosera pallida	Lindl.	1839	Pale rainbow	Australia	
Drosera paradoxa	Lowrie	1997		Australia	
Drosera patens	Lowrie & Conran	2007		Australia	
Drosera pauciflora	Banks ex DC.	1824		South Africa	
Drosera pedicellaris	Lowrie	2002		Australia	
Drosera peltata	Thunb.	1797	Shield sundew, pale sundew	Australia, New Zealand, Southeast Asia	
Drosera peruensis	T.R.S.Silva & M.D.Correa	2002		Peru	
Drosera petiolaris	R.Br. ex DC.	1824	Larmi	Australia, New Guinea	
Drosera pilosa	Exell & Laundon	1956		Cameroon, Guinea, Kenya, Tanzania	
Drosera × pingellyensis	Lowrie & Conran	2013		Australia	
Drosera planchonii	Hook.f ex.Planch.	1848	Climbing sundew	Australia	
Drosera platypoda	Turcz.	1854	Fan-leaved sundew	Australia	
Drosera platystigma	Lehm.	1844	Black-eyed sundew	Australia	
Drosera porrecta	Lehm.	1844		Australia	
Drosera praefolia	Tepper	1892		Australia	
Drosera prolifera	C.T.White	1940		Australia	
Drosera prophylla	(N.G.Marchant & Lowrie) Lowrie	2013		Australia	
Drosera prostrata	(N.G.Marchant & Lowrie) Lowrie	2005		Australia	
Drosera prostratoscaposa	Lowrie & Carlquist	1990		Australia	
Drosera pulchella	Lehm.	1844	Pretty sundew	Australia	
Drosera purpurascens	Schlotth.	1856		Australia	
Drosera pycnoblasta	Diels	1904	Pearly sundew	Australia	
Drosera pygmaea	DC.	1824		Australia, New Zealand	
Drosera quartzicola	Rivadavia & Gonella	2011		Brazil	
Drosera radicans	N.G.Marchant	1982		Australia	
Drosera ramellosa	Lehm.	1844	Branched sundew	Australia	
Drosera ramentacea	Burch. ex DC.	1824		South Africa	
Drosera rechingeri	Strid	1987		Australia	
Drosera reflexa	Bourke & A.S.Rob.	2023		Australia	
Drosera regia	Stephens	1926	King sundew	South Africa	
Drosera riparia	Gonella & Rivadavia	2014		Brazil	
Drosera roraimae	(Klotzsch ex Diels) Maguire & Laundon	1957		Brazil, Guyana, Venezuela	
Drosera roseana	N.G.Marchant & Lowrie	1992		Australia	
Drosera rosulata	Lehm.	1844		Australia	
Drosera rotundifolia	L.	1753	Common sundew, round-leaved sundew	circumboreal North America, Europe, Asia	
Drosera rubricalyx	T.Krueger & A.Fleischm.	2023		Australia	
Drosera rubrifolia	Debbert	2002		South Africa	
Drosera rupicola	(N.G.Marchant) Lowrie	2005		Australia	
Drosera salina	N.G.Marchant & Lowrie	1992		Australia	
Drosera sargentii	Lowrie & N.G.Marchant	1992		Australia	
Drosera schizandra	Diels	1906		Australia	
Drosera schmutzii	Lowrie & Conran	2008		Australia	
Drosera schwackei	(Diels) Rivadavia	2008		Brazil	
Drosera scorpioides	Planch.	1848	Shaggy sundew	Australia	
Drosera serpens	Planch.	1848		SE Asia, Australia	
Drosera sessilifolia	A.St.-Hil.	1824		Brazil, Guyana, Venezuela	
Drosera sewelliae	Diels	1904	Red woolly sundew	Australia	
Drosera × sidjamesii	Lowrie & Conran	2007		Australia	
Drosera silvicola	Lowrie & Carlquist	1992		Australia	
Drosera slackii	Cheek	1987		South Africa	
Drosera solaris	A.Fleischm., Wistuba & S.McPherson	2007		Guyana	
Drosera spatulata	Labill.	1804	Spoon-leaved sundew	Australia, New Zealand, Southeast Asia	
Drosera spilos	N.G.Marchant & Lowrie	1992		Australia	
Drosera spiralis	A.St.-Hil.	1826		Brazil	
Drosera spirocalyx	Rivadavia & Gonella	2014		Brazil	
Drosera squamosa	Benth.	1864		Australia	
Drosera stelliflora	Lowrie & Carlquist	1992		Australia	
Drosera stenopetala	Hook.f.	1853		New Zealand	
Drosera stipularis	Baleeiro, R.W.Jobson & R.L.Barrett	2020		Australia	
Drosera stolonifera	Endl.	1837	Leafy sundew	Australia	
Drosera stricticaulis	(Diels) O.H.Sarg.	1913	Erect sundew	Australia	
Drosera subhirtella	Planch.	1848	Sunny rainbow	Australia	
Drosera subtilis	N.G.Marchant	1982		Australia	
Drosera sulphurea	Lehm.	1844	Sulphur-flowered sundew	Australia	
Drosera tentaculata	Rivadavia	2003		Brazil	
Drosera thysanosepala	Diels	1906		Australia	
Drosera tokaiensis	(Komiya & C.Shibata) T.Nakamura & K.Ueda	1991		Japan	
Drosera tomentosa	A.St.-Hil.	1824		Brazil	
Drosera tracyi	Macfarl.	1914		USA	
Drosera trichocaulis	(Diels) Lowrie & Conran	2013		Australia	
Drosera trinervia	Spreng.	1820		South Africa	
Drosera tubaestylis	N.G.Marchant & Lowrie	1992		Australia	
Drosera ultramafica	A.Fleischm., A.S.Rob. & S.McPherson	2011	Ultramafic-growing sundew	Malesia	
Drosera uniflora	Willd.	1809		Argentina, Chile, Falkland Islands	
Drosera venusta	Debbert	1987		South Africa	
Drosera verrucata	Lowrie & Conran	2013		Australia	
Drosera villosa	A.St.-Hil.	1826		Brazil	
Drosera viridis	Rivadavia	2003		Brazil	
Drosera walyunga	N.G.Marchant & Lowrie	1992		Australia	
Drosera whittakeri	Planch.	1848	Scented sundew, Whittaker's sundew	Australia	
Drosera × woodii	R.Gauthier & Gervais	1999		North America	
Drosera xerophila	A.Fleischm.	2018		South Africa	
Drosera yilgarnensis	R.P.Gibson & B.J.Conn	2012		Australia	
Drosera yutajensis	R.Duno & Culham	1995		Venezuela	
Drosera zeyheri	Salter	1940		South Africa	
Drosera zigzagia	Lowrie	1999		Australia	
Drosera zonaria	Planch.	1848	Painted sundew	Australia	

== See also ==
- Taxonomy of Drosera

== Notes ==
a.Years given denote the year of the species's formal publication under the current name, thus excluding the earlier basionym date of publication if one exists.
