= Drosera glabriscapa =

Conservation status
- Least Concern (IUCN 3.1)

Scientific classification
- Kingdom: Plantae
- Clade: Tracheophytes
- Clade: Angiosperms
- Clade: Eudicots
- Order: Caryophyllales
- Family: Droseraceae
- Genus: Drosera
- Subgenus: Drosera subg. Drosera
- Section: Drosera sect. Arachnopus
- Species: D. glabriscapa

Binomial name
- Drosera glabriscapa Lowrie

Species of carnivorous plant

Drosera glabriscapa is a species of sundew endemic in the Kimberley region of Western Australia. It was first described by Allen Lowrie in his 2014 Carnivorous Plants of Australia. Like other members of Drosera sect. Arachnopus it is an annual therophyte.

The species name refers to the fact that the flower stalks of this species are glabrous (from Latin glabris [smooth, hairless] + scapus [stalk, peduncle]).
