= Drosera cucullata =

Conservation status
- Least Concern (IUCN 3.1)

Scientific classification
- Kingdom: Plantae
- Clade: Tracheophytes
- Clade: Angiosperms
- Clade: Eudicots
- Order: Caryophyllales
- Family: Droseraceae
- Genus: Drosera
- Subgenus: Drosera subg. Drosera
- Section: Drosera sect. Arachnopus
- Species: D. cucullata

Binomial name
- Drosera cucullata Lowrie

Species of carnivorous plant

Drosera cucullata is a species of sundew endemic to the north of Western Australia and the Northern Territory. It was first described by Allen Lowrie in his 2014 Carnivorous Plants of Australia Magnum Opus. Like other members of Drosera sect. Arachnopus it is an annual therophyte.

The species name refers to the stamens, which are large, red and "hooded like a threatened cobra" (from Latin cucullatus [hooded]).
