= Drosera barrettiorum =

Conservation status
- Least Concern (IUCN 3.1)

Scientific classification
- Kingdom: Plantae
- Clade: Tracheophytes
- Clade: Angiosperms
- Clade: Eudicots
- Order: Caryophyllales
- Family: Droseraceae
- Genus: Drosera
- Subgenus: Drosera subg. Drosera
- Section: Drosera sect. Arachnopus
- Species: D. barrettiorum

Binomial name
- Drosera barrettiorum Lowrie

Species of carnivorous plant

Drosera barrettiorum is a species of sundew endemic to the north of Western Australia. It was first described by Allen Lowrie in his 2014 Carnivorous Plants of Australia Magnum Opus. Like other members of Drosera sect. Arachnopus it is an annual therophyte.

The species is named for brothers Russell and Matthew Barrett, who first discovered the species near their home in the Kimberley region. It was originally published with the spelling barrettorum, but this was non-compliant with Article 60 of the International Code of Nomenclature for algae, fungi, and plants and was corrected to barrettiorum in the first volume of the 2017 work Drosera of the World (also lead-authored by Lowrie).
