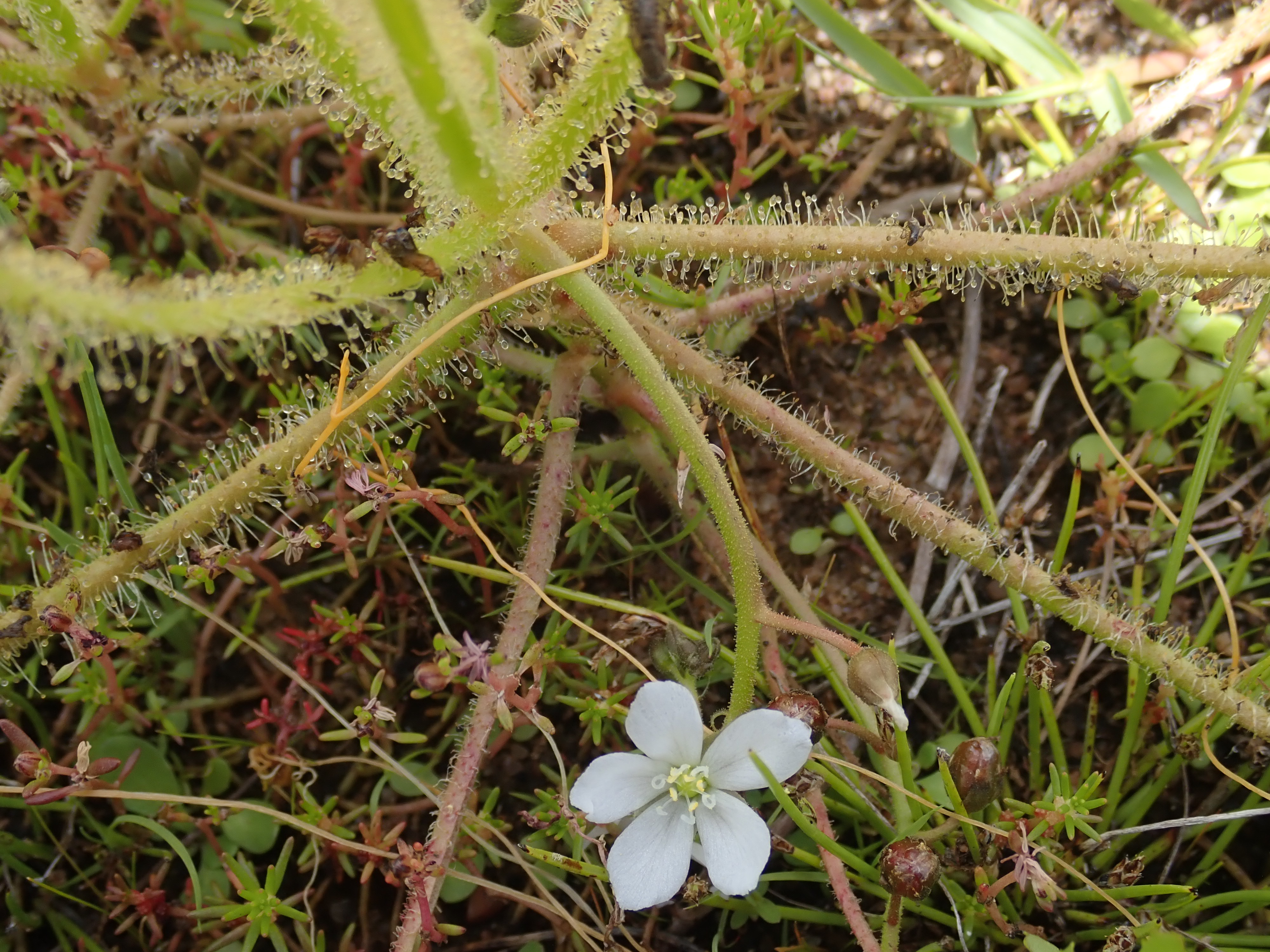

Scientific classification
- Kingdom: Plantae
- Clade: Tracheophytes
- Clade: Angiosperms
- Clade: Eudicots
- Order: Caryophyllales
- Family: Droseraceae
- Genus: Drosera
- Subgenus: Drosera subg. Drosera
- Section: Drosera sect. Arachnopus
- Species: D. finlaysoniana

Binomial name
- Drosera finlaysoniana Wall. ex Arn.

Synonyms
- Drosera angustifolia F.Muell. Drosera indica f. robusta F.M.Bailey

= Drosera finlaysoniana =

Species of plant

Drosera finlaysoniana is a species of sundew native to Australia, Hainan, Taiwan, the Philippines and Mainland Southeast Asia. Like other members of Drosera sect. Arachnopus it is an annual.

More commonly found in the north of Australia. In southern Australian sites it has been recorded at inland areas, in eucalyptus woodlands subject to flooding. Also found in Hainan, Taiwan, the Indo-China region and the Philippines.

== Taxonomy ==
The specific epithet D. finlaysoniana honours George Finlayson, who first collected specimens of the plant from Turon Bay, Cochinchina (now Da Nang Bay, Vietnam) during the East India Company's mission to Cochinchina in 1821—22, for which Finlayson was the accompanying medical officer. The name was first given by Nathaniel Wallich in 1831 to a specimen listed in his Numerical list of dried specimens of plants in the East India Company's Museum, collected under the superintendence of Dr. Wallich of the Company's Botanic Garden at Calcutta (more commonly known as the Wallich Catalogue). However, this name was not validly published as it lacked a description. In 1837, George Arnott Walker Arnott provided a brief description of the plant using the name D. Finlaysoni and noting that it was “much larger than [D. indica], and presents a considerable difference in habit”.

The name, D. finlaysoniana, is accepted by Australian authorities. and by Plants of the World Online, and WCSP, but not by World Flora Online. For some time, this species was considered synonymous with D. indica, but in 2013 Russell Barrett & Allen Lowrie resurrected it, noting that

1. "the stalked glandular hairs at the base of the (leaf) lamina do not reach all the way to the stem"
2. "there are only a few short, simple hairs among the glandular hairs at the base of the lamina"
3. "anthers are classed as normal, not hooded or dilated"
4. "seeds have a distinctly reticulate surface" and
5. are "relatively small".
