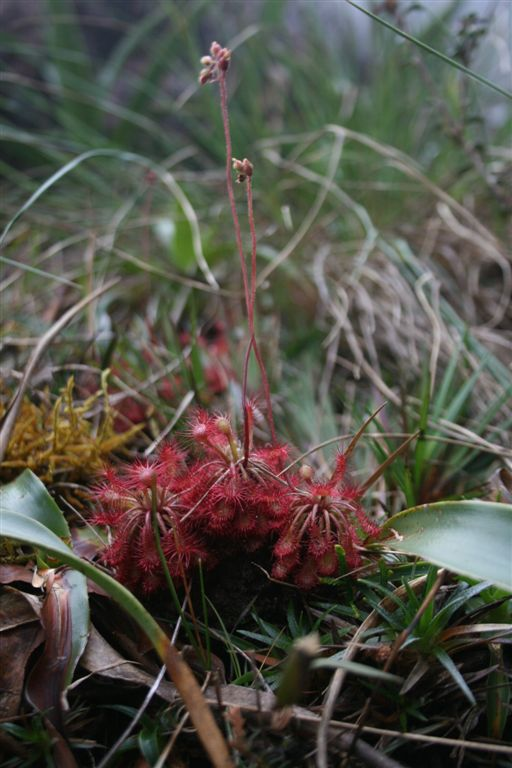
- Drosera roraimae on Mount Roraima

Scientific classification
- Kingdom: Plantae
- Clade: Tracheophytes
- Clade: Angiosperms
- Clade: Eudicots
- Order: Caryophyllales
- Family: Droseraceae
- Genus: Drosera
- Subgenus: Drosera subg. Drosera
- Section: Drosera sect. Drosera
- Species: D. roraimae

Binomial name
- Drosera roraimae (Klotzsch ex Diels) Maguire & Laundon

Synonyms
- Drosera montana var. roraimae Klotzsch ex Diels; Drosera montana var. robusta Diels

= Drosera roraimae =

Species of carnivorous plant

Drosera roraimae is a sundew native to Brazil, Guyana, and Venezuela. It was originally described as a variety of Drosera montana before being raised to species rank in 1957.

The specific epithet roraimae refers to Mount Roraima, a tepui or table-top mountain, where the type specimen was collected.

== See also ==
- List of Drosera species
- Taxonomy of Drosera
