= Drosera nana =

Conservation status
- Least Concern (IUCN 3.1)

Scientific classification
- Kingdom: Plantae
- Clade: Tracheophytes
- Clade: Angiosperms
- Clade: Eudicots
- Order: Caryophyllales
- Family: Droseraceae
- Genus: Drosera
- Subgenus: Drosera subg. Drosera
- Section: Drosera sect. Arachnopus
- Species: D. nana

Binomial name
- Drosera nana Lowrie

Species of carnivorous plant

Drosera nana is a species of sundew endemic to the north of Western Australia and the Northern Territory. It was first described by Allen Lowrie in his 2014 Carnivorous Plants of Australia Magnum Opus. Like other members of Drosera sect. Arachnopus it is an annual therophyte.

The specific epithet nana is from Latin nanus meaning 'dwarf', referring to the small size at maturity of this species compared to others in sect. Arachnopus.
