= Drosera maanyaa-gooljoo =

Scientific classification
- Kingdom: Plantae
- Clade: Tracheophytes
- Clade: Angiosperms
- Clade: Eudicots
- Order: Caryophyllales
- Family: Droseraceae
- Genus: Drosera
- Subgenus: Drosera subg. Drosera
- Section: Drosera sect. Arachnopus
- Species: D. maanyaa-gooljoo

Binomial name
- Drosera maanyaa-gooljoo A.Fleischm. & T.Krueger

Species of carnivorous plant

Drosera maanyaa-gooljoo is a species of sundew endemic to the Kimberley region of Western Australia. It was first described by Andreas Fleischmann and Thilo Krueger in 2023. The type material was collected much earlier, in 1982, but was originally categorised within D. indica (at the time, the only recognised species of what is now sect. Arachnopus) and later as a form of D. fragrans. Like other members of Drosera sect. Arachnopus it is an annual therophyte.

The species is known from only two locations, both situated within the exclusive Native Title lands of the Dambimangari and Mayala people. First identified as a new taxon based upon herbarium specimens, the species was then located in the wild with the assistance of a Dambimangari Ranger. The specific epithet was chosen by the Dambimangari and Mayala people. It combines the name given to the plant in the Worrorra language, maanyaa, with the Bardi word gooljoo meaning 'grass'. Maanyaa means 'centipede'; with their very long tentacles, the leaves of this species resemble long-legged centipedes such as Scutigeridae.
