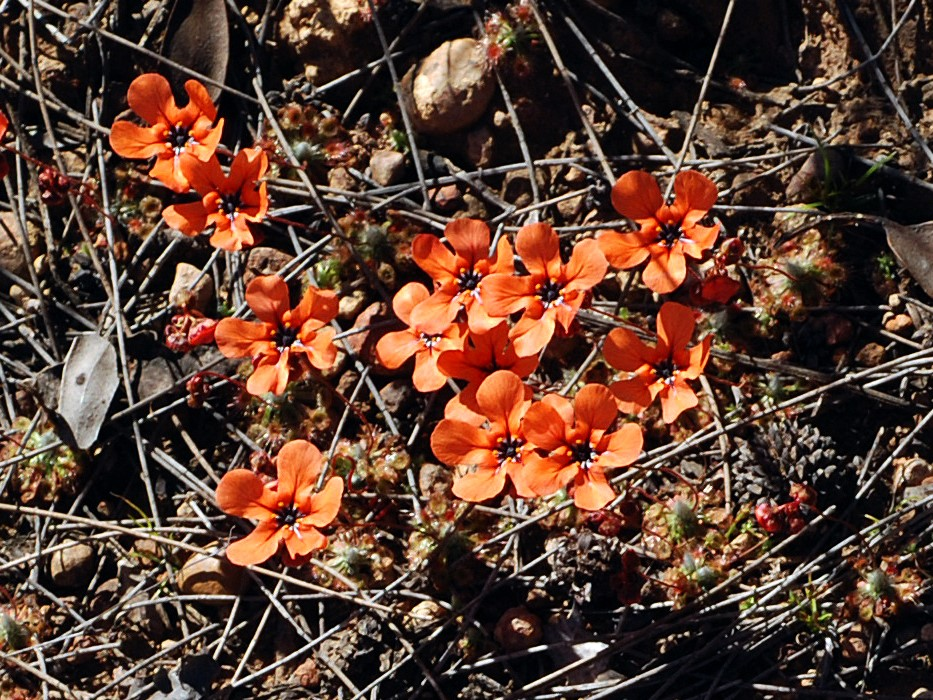

Scientific classification
- Kingdom: Plantae
- Clade: Tracheophytes
- Clade: Angiosperms
- Clade: Eudicots
- Order: Caryophyllales
- Family: Droseraceae
- Genus: Drosera
- Subgenus: Drosera subg. Ergaleium
- Section: Drosera sect. Bryastrum
- Species: D. albonotata

Binomial name
- Drosera albonotata A.S.Rob., A.T.Cross, Meisterl & A.Fleischm.

= Drosera albonotata =

Species of carnivorous plant

Drosera albonotata is a species of pygmy sundew native to Western Australia. It was first described by Alastair Robinson, Adam Cross, Manfred Meisterl and Andreas Fleischmann in 2018.

== Etymology ==
The specific epithet albonotata (white-marked) refers to the white patches at the base of the petals, which is one of the characteristics by which it is distinguished from other orange-flowered pygmy Drosera and in particular D. miniata.

== Description ==
Drosera albonotata forms small rosettes typically 15 mm in diameter, with up to 22 mm having been recorded. It may form a short stem of old growth. The orange flowers are produced in September and October and are large (relative to the size of the plant) at around 25 mm diameter. Between one and fifteen flowers are held on each inflorescence which may be up to 14 cm tall.

Along with the white 'collar' surrounding the centre of the flower, D. albonotata is also differentiated from D. miniata by petal venation, shape of petals and sepals, colour of anthers, leaf shape, and the quantity and density of particular glands and trichomes on the leaves.

== See also ==
- List of Drosera species
