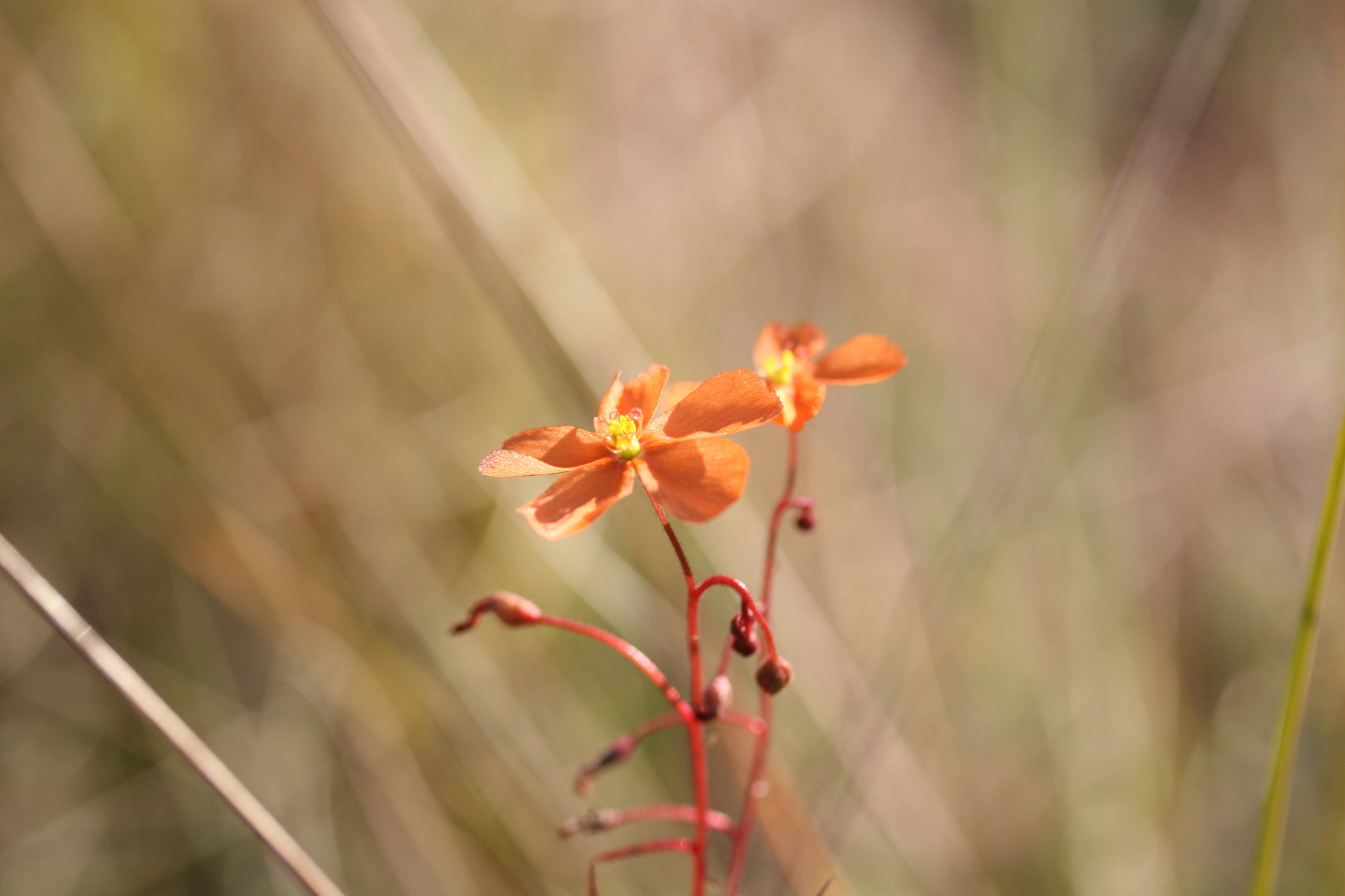
- Flowers of Drosera aurantiaca

Conservation status
- Least Concern (IUCN 3.1)

Scientific classification
- Kingdom: Plantae
- Clade: Tracheophytes
- Clade: Angiosperms
- Clade: Eudicots
- Order: Caryophyllales
- Family: Droseraceae
- Genus: Drosera
- Subgenus: Drosera subg. Drosera
- Section: Drosera sect. Arachnopus
- Species: D. aurantiaca

Binomial name
- Drosera aurantiaca Lowrie

= Drosera aurantiaca =

Species of carnivorous plant

Drosera aurantiaca is a species of sundew endemic to the Northern Territory and the north of Western Australia. It was first described by Allen Lowrie in his 2014 Carnivorous Plants of Australia Magnum Opus. Like other members of Drosera sect. Arachnopus it is an annual therophyte.

The specific epithet aurantiaca (Latin: 'orange-coloured') refers to the orange flowers of this species.
