= Drosera fragrans =

Conservation status
- Least Concern (IUCN 3.1)

Scientific classification
- Kingdom: Plantae
- Clade: Embryophytes
- Clade: Tracheophytes
- Clade: Angiosperms
- Clade: Eudicots
- Order: Caryophyllales
- Family: Droseraceae
- Genus: Drosera
- Subgenus: Drosera subg. Drosera
- Section: Drosera sect. Arachnopus
- Species: D. fragrans

Binomial name
- Drosera fragrans Lowrie

Species of carnivorous plant

Drosera fragrans is a species of sundew endemic to the north of Western Australia and the Northern Territory. It was first described by Allen Lowrie in his 2014 Carnivorous Plants of Australia Magnum Opus. Like other members of Drosera sect. Arachnopus it is an annual therophyte.

The species name refers to the strong sweet scent produced by the plant's leaves and stem, which is described as reminiscent of honeydew melon. It appears that this fragrance may influence the types of prey captured.
