= Drosera australis =

Scientific classification
- Kingdom: Plantae
- Clade: Embryophytes
- Clade: Tracheophytes
- Clade: Angiosperms
- Clade: Eudicots
- Order: Caryophyllales
- Family: Droseraceae
- Genus: Drosera
- Subgenus: Drosera subg. Ergaleium
- Section: Drosera sect. Bryastrum
- Species: D. australis

Binomial name
- Drosera australis (N.G.Marchant & Lowrie) Lowrie & Conran

Species of flowering plant

Drosera australis is a species of pygmy sundew in the family Droseraceae. It is endemic to Western Australia.
