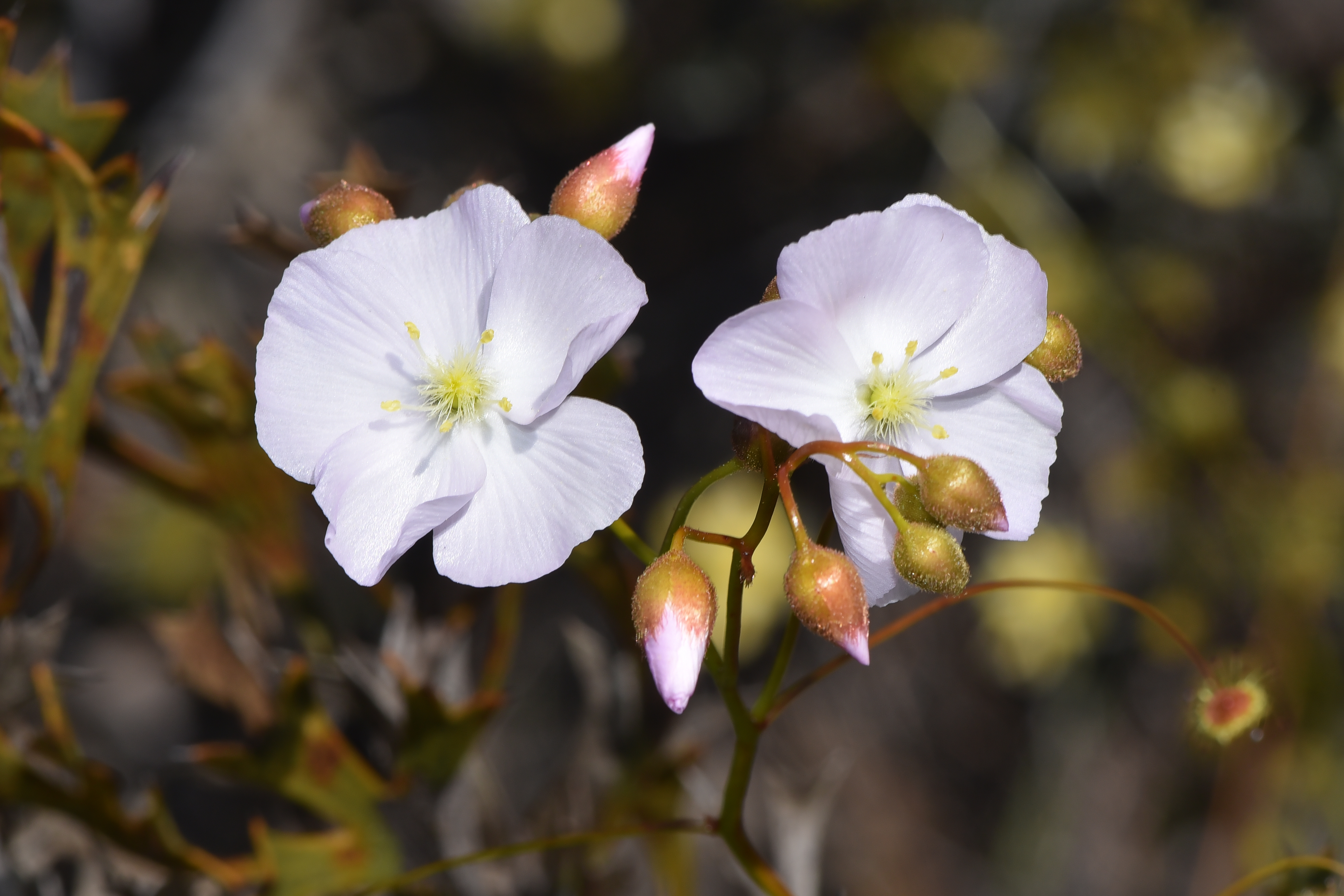

Conservation status
- Least Concern (IUCN 3.1)

Scientific classification
- Kingdom: Plantae
- Clade: Tracheophytes
- Clade: Angiosperms
- Clade: Eudicots
- Order: Caryophyllales
- Family: Droseraceae
- Genus: Drosera
- Species: D. drummondii

Binomial name
- Drosera drummondii Planch.

= Drosera drummondii =

Species of carnivorous plant

Drosera drummondii is a plant in the family Droseraceae, native to Western Australia.

The species was first described by Jules Émile Planchon in 1848.

In the IUCN Red List its conservation status is assessed as being of "Least Concern".

== See also ==
- List of Drosera species
