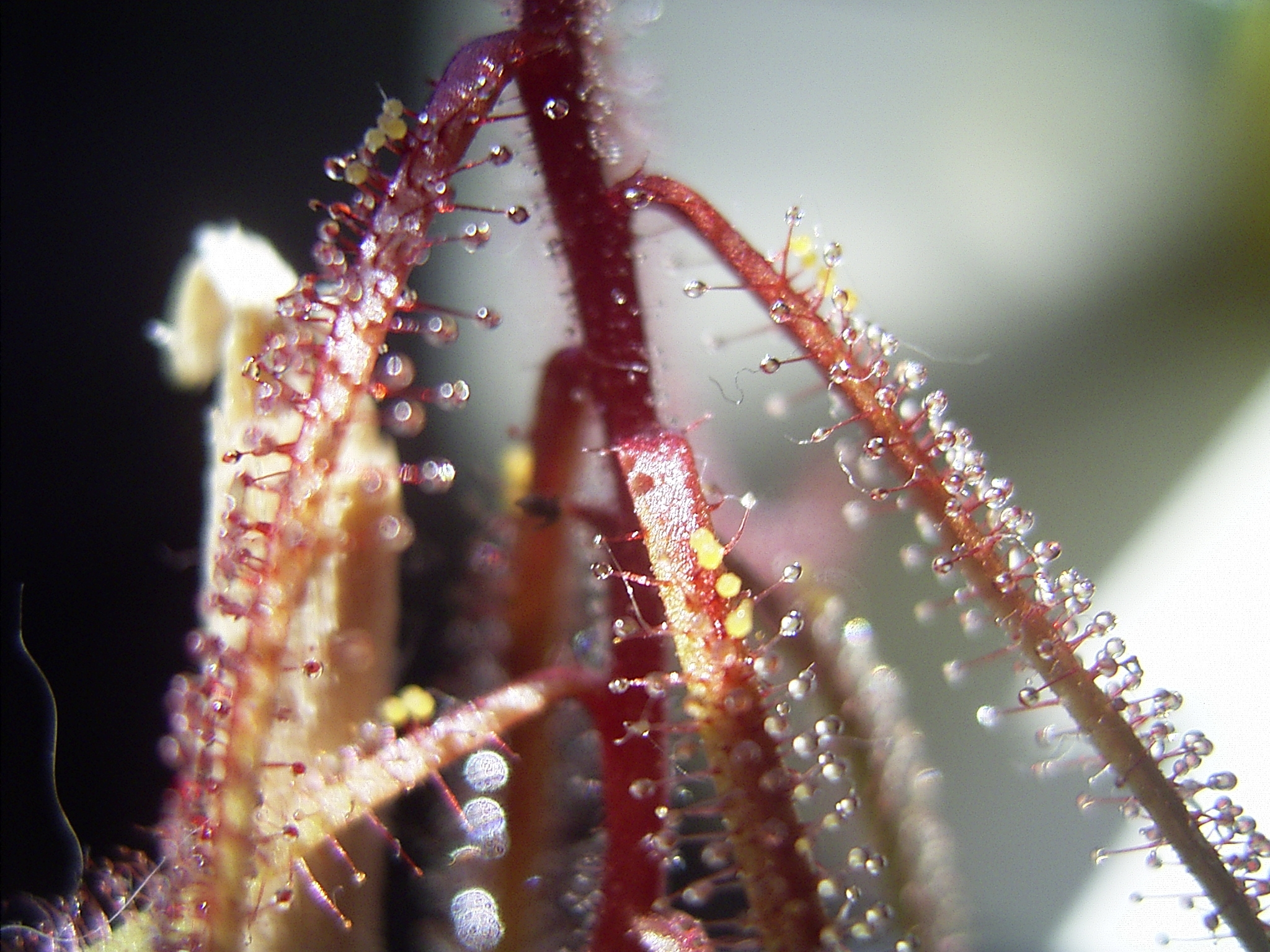
- A closeup of Drosera hartmeyerorum

Scientific classification
- Kingdom: Plantae
- Clade: Tracheophytes
- Clade: Angiosperms
- Clade: Eudicots
- Order: Caryophyllales
- Family: Droseraceae
- Genus: Drosera
- Subgenus: Drosera subg. Drosera
- Section: Drosera sect. Arachnopus
- Species: D. hartmeyerorum

Binomial name
- Drosera hartmeyerorum Schlauer (2001)

= Drosera hartmeyerorum =

Species of carnivorous plant

Drosera hartmeyerorum is a summer-growing annual sundew that is native to the north of Western Australia. It was discovered in 1995 by Siegfried and Irmgard Hartmeyer. Drosera hartmeyerorum has long scrambling leaves which readily curl around any unfortunate insect that lands on the leaves. One major thing that separates this sundew from others are the round yellow trichomes at the base of the leaves. The function of the yellow trichomes is uncertain. Like most sundews, it grows in warm wet, sandy, peaty areas with high humidity and low nutrient levels in the soil.

Drosera hartmeyerorum was initially thought to be a subspecies of D. indica, but was later elevated to species status. Together with D. indica, it forms section Arachnopus of the genus Drosera.

Drosera hartmeyerorum is not fond of warmer temperatures, and should be cultivated under cool conditions.

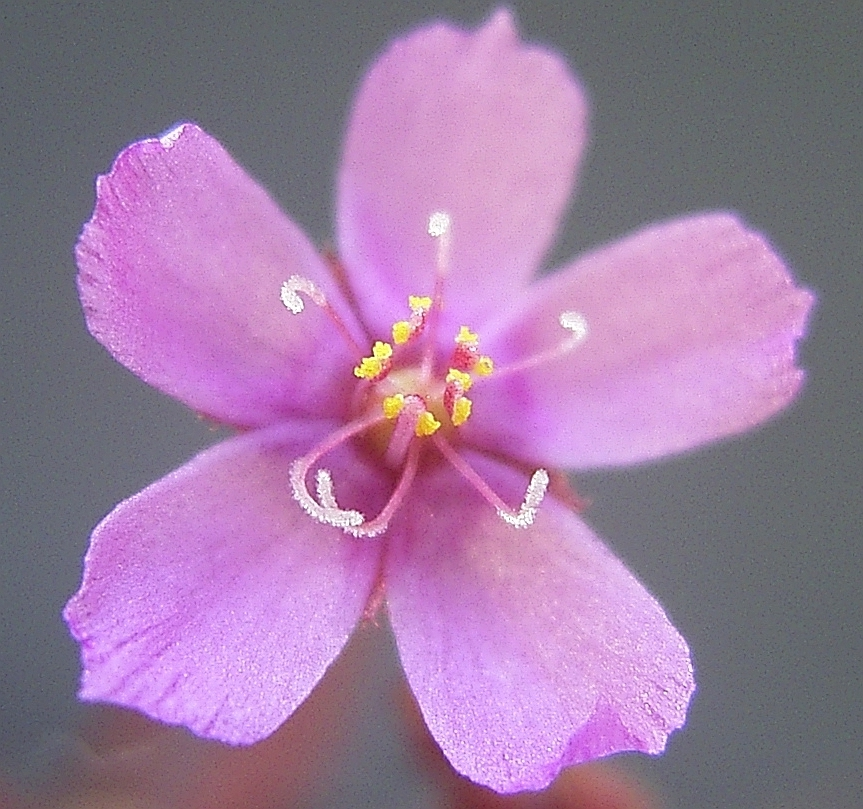
A flower of Drosera hartmeyerorum
