= Drosera aquatica =

Conservation status
- Least Concern (IUCN 3.1)

Scientific classification
- Kingdom: Plantae
- Clade: Tracheophytes
- Clade: Angiosperms
- Clade: Eudicots
- Order: Caryophyllales
- Family: Droseraceae
- Genus: Drosera
- Subgenus: Drosera subg. Drosera
- Section: Drosera sect. Arachnopus
- Species: D. aquatica

Binomial name
- Drosera aquatica Lowrie

Species of carnivorous plant

Drosera aquatica is a species of sundew endemic to the Northern Territory and Western Australia. It was first described by Allen Lowrie in 2013. Like other members of Drosera sect. Arachnopus it is an annual therophyte.

As the specific epithet implies, D. aquatica can be entirely aquatic, floating on the surface of floodwaters from the Australian monsoon.
