= Conran =

Conran is a surname. Notable people with the surname include:

- Alexis Conran, British actor
- Alys Conran, Welsh poet
- Conran of Orkney, 7th-century Bishop of Orkney
- H. L. Conran (1861–1924), Australian pastoralist and stockbroker
- Jasper Conran (born 1959), British fashion designer
- John Conran (born 1958), Irish hurling player and manager
- Kerry Conran, American film director, and writer
- Shirley Conran (1932–2024), British novelist, mother of Jasper
- Sebastian Conran (born 1956), British product designer, son of Shirley and brother of Jasper
- Sophie Conran (born 1965), British designer, half-sister of Jasper and Sebastian
- Terence Conran (1931–2020), British designer and writer, father of Jasper and Sebastian
- Tony Conran (1931–2013), Welsh poet

== See also ==
- Conran, Missouri, USA
- Conran Octopus, British book publisher
