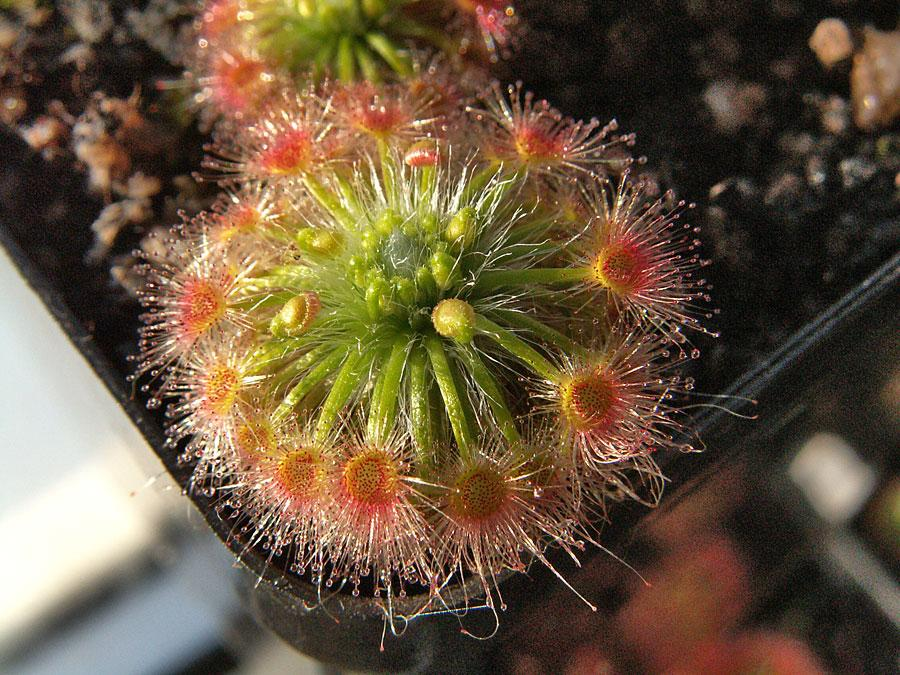

Scientific classification
- Kingdom: Plantae
- Clade: Tracheophytes
- Clade: Angiosperms
- Clade: Eudicots
- Order: Caryophyllales
- Family: Droseraceae
- Genus: Drosera
- Species: D. oreopodion

Binomial name
- Drosera oreopodion N.G.Marchant & Lowrie

= Drosera oreopodion =

Species of plant

Drosera oreopodion is a species of sundew and a member of the carnivorous plant family Droseraceae. It is endemic to the foothills of the Darling Range of Western Australia. It is most noteworthy for being the smallest of all carnivorous plants, with leaves only 5.5 mm (0.22 in) length, of which the sticky, circular lamina is only 1.5 mm wide. It is a fairly recent discovery, being unknown prior to 1987 when discovered by Allen Lowrie. The very thin (almost capillary) inflorescence is 3.5 cm (1.4 in) height.
