= Drosera androsacea =

Conservation status
- Least Concern (IUCN 3.1)

Scientific classification
- Kingdom: Plantae
- Clade: Tracheophytes
- Clade: Angiosperms
- Clade: Eudicots
- Order: Caryophyllales
- Family: Droseraceae
- Genus: Drosera
- Subgenus: Drosera subg. Ergaleium
- Section: Drosera sect. Bryastrum
- Species: D. androsacea

Binomial name
- Drosera androsacea Diels

Species of carnivorous plant

Drosera androsacea is a species of sundew native to western Australia. It was first described by Ludwig Diels in 1904.
