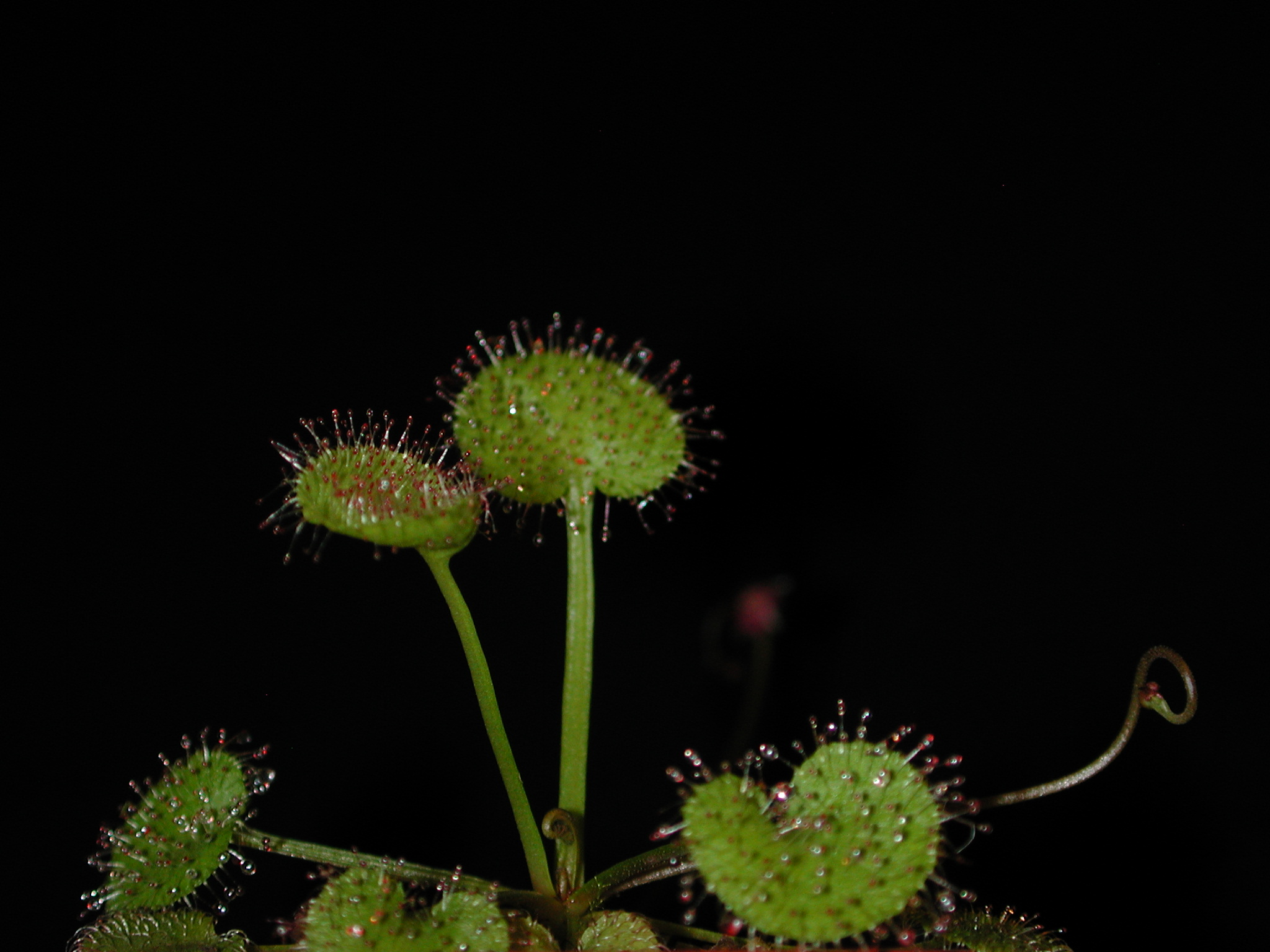

Conservation status
- Vulnerable (NCA)

Scientific classification
- Kingdom: Plantae
- Clade: Tracheophytes
- Clade: Angiosperms
- Clade: Eudicots
- Order: Caryophyllales
- Family: Droseraceae
- Genus: Drosera
- Subgenus: Drosera subg. Drosera
- Section: Drosera sect. Prolifera
- Species: D. prolifera

Binomial name
- Drosera prolifera C.T.White

= Drosera prolifera =

Species of carnivorous plant

Drosera prolifera is a species of Drosera found in Queensland, Australia.

Range of D. prolifera in the wild

== See also ==
- List of Drosera species
