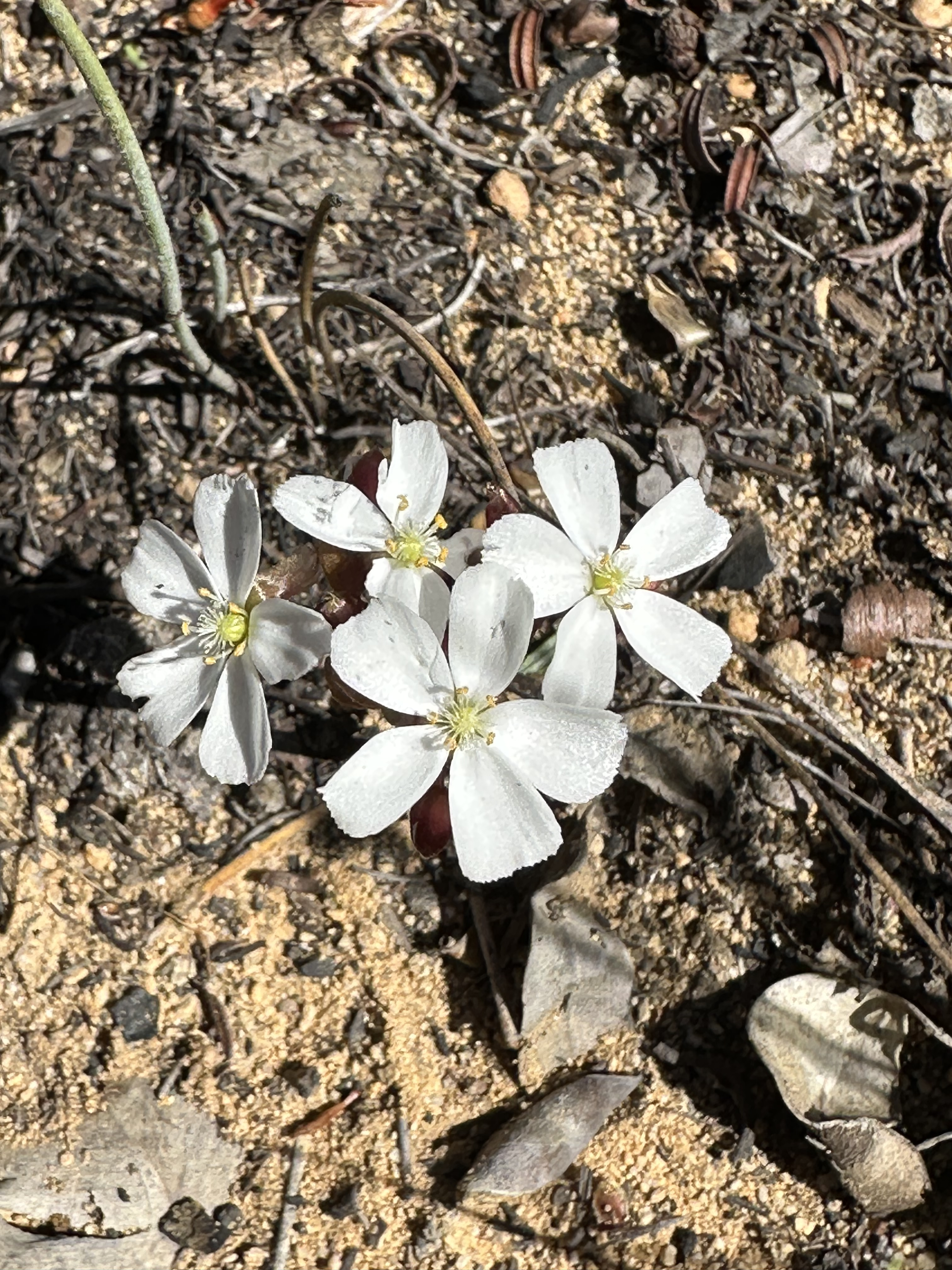

Scientific classification
- Kingdom: Plantae
- Clade: Tracheophytes
- Clade: Angiosperms
- Clade: Eudicots
- Order: Caryophyllales
- Family: Droseraceae
- Genus: Drosera
- Species: D. collina

Binomial name
- Drosera collina (N.G.Marchant & Lowrie) Lowrie

= Drosera collina =

Australian carnivorous plant

Drosera collina is a species of sundew native to Southwest Australia.

== Description ==
The plant is tuberous and perennial and is rosetted with 10 - 12 leaves per rosette reaching 10 to 12 cm (3.9 - 4.7 in) in diameter. Its species epithet derives from the Latin word collina meaning "hill" as it is found the throughout the Darling Scarp.
