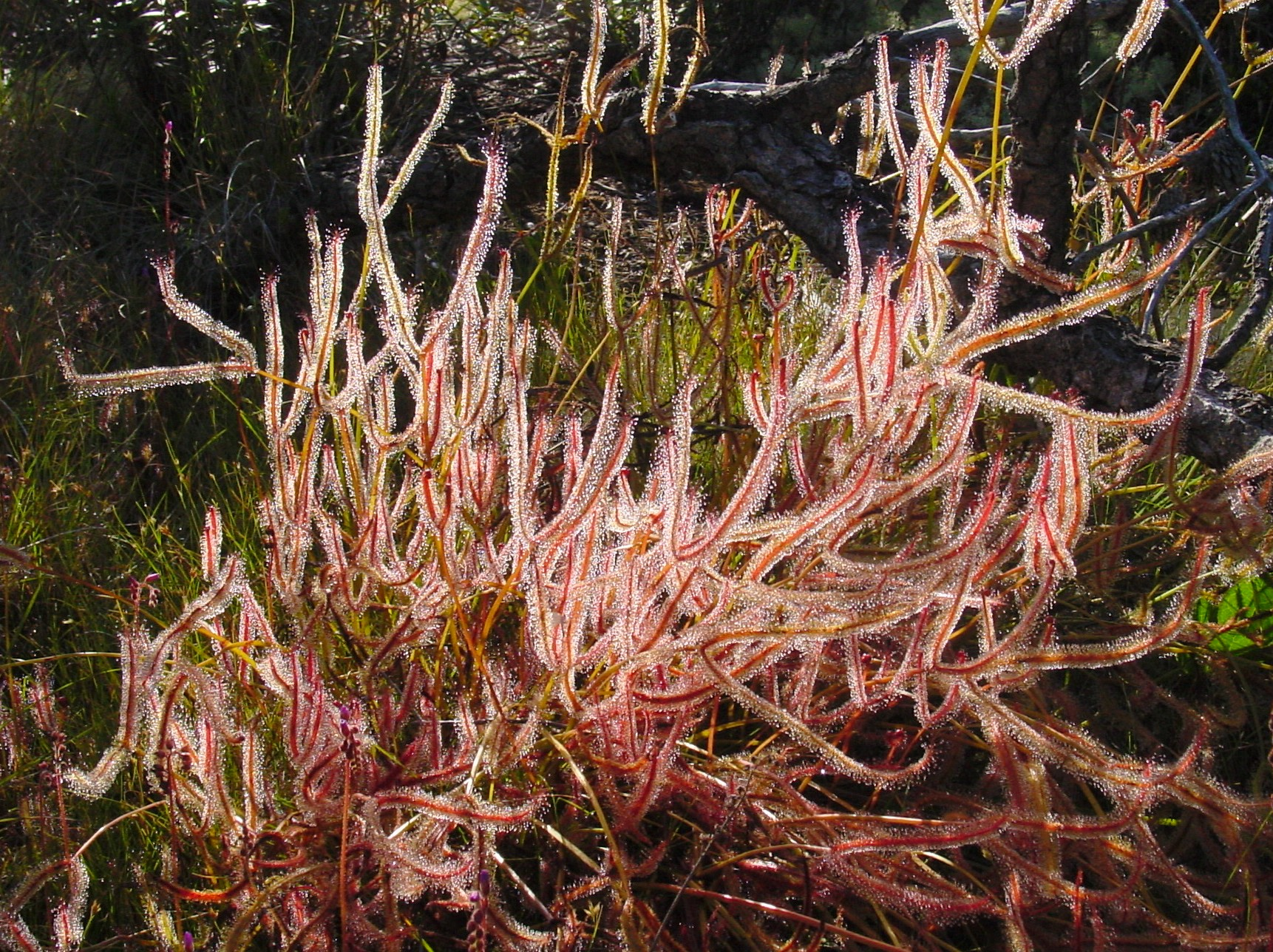

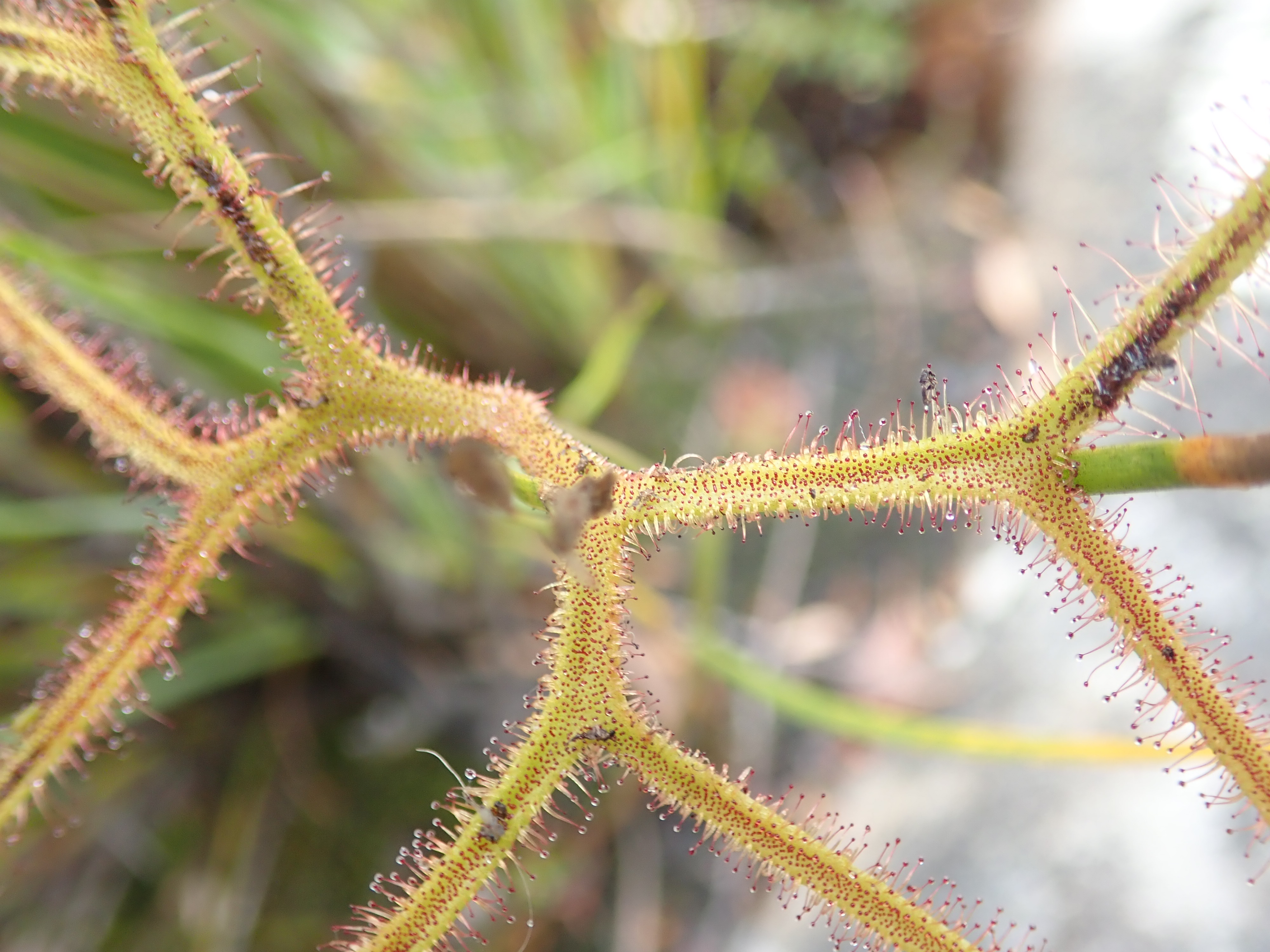

Scientific classification
- Kingdom: Plantae
- Clade: Tracheophytes
- Clade: Angiosperms
- Clade: Eudicots
- Order: Caryophyllales
- Family: Droseraceae
- Genus: Drosera
- Subgenus: Drosera subg. Ergaleium
- Section: Drosera sect. Phycopsis; Planch.
- Species: D. binata

Binomial name
- Drosera binata Labill.
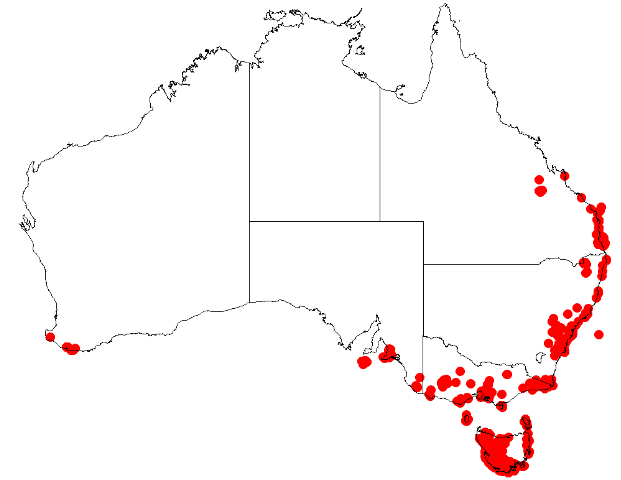
- Occurrence data from AVH

Synonyms
- Dismophyla binata (Labill.) Raf.; Drosera cunninghamii Walp.; Drosera dichotoma Banks & Sol. ex Sm.; Drosera flagellifera Colenso; Drosera pedata Pers.

= Drosera binata =

Species of carnivorous plant

Drosera binata, commonly known as the forked sundew or fork-leaved sundew. It is a large, perennial sundew native to south-eastern Australia and New Zealand. The specific epithet is Latin for "having pairs", a reference to the leaves, which are dichotomously (sometimes twice-dichotomously) divided or forked. These leaves are up to 60 cm (24 in) long.

Like all sundews, it is a carnivorous plant. It is unique among sundews in having narrow, branching leaves. It is the only species in the Drosera section Phycopsis.

== Distribution and habitat ==
D. binata occurs naturally in Australia, primarily in coastal areas from Fraser Island in Queensland, southwards down through New South Wales and Victoria to Tasmania and the south-east corner of South Australia. The range of this species extends to New Zealand where it is common below an elevation of 1,000 metres, being found in both the North and South Islands, Stewart Island / Rakiura and farther afield on the Chathams. Some populations go dormant in the winter, while others are truly tropical.

== Taxonomy and botanical history ==
Plants similar to the type specimen, commonly referred to as the "T-form", were first collected in 1792 by the French exploration of Australia's southern coast led by Bruni d'Entrecasteaux. The naturalist on board that expedition, Jacques Labillardière, first described D. binata in his 1804 publication on the flora of Australia, Novae Hollandiae Plantarum Specimen. The T-form, so named for its single leaf bifurcation spreading into a T-shape, is a robust plant from temperate zones that can grow up to 30 cm (12 in) and has green foliage that becomes redder with age. This form has been described as being genetically stable.

The second observed form, commonly referred to as var. dichotoma, is similar to the T-form, but the foliage is yellower and the leaf typically divides into four terminal leaf points, though it has been known to produce as many as eight leaf points. It was first validly described in an 1819 volume of Rees's Cyclopædia by James Edward Smith as D. dichotoma, based on the description by Joseph Banks and Daniel Solander. This name, however, has since been reduced to synonymy with D. binata. This morphological form was first published as "var. dichotoma" by J. A. Mazrimas in a 1976 volume of the Carnivorous Plant Newsletter, but the publication of that name was invalid under the rules of the International Code of Botanical Nomenclature. Even though the name is not valid, it is still widely used in cultivation to refer to this D. binata form. This was one of many plants used by Charles Darwin in his investigation of carnivorous plants for his 1875 book Insectivorous Plants.

A third described form, often called D. binata f. multifida, has even more leaf divisions, bifurcating several times to produce anywhere from eight to 16 or even 30 terminal leaf points. This, too, was published by J. A. Mazrimas in the same 1976 volume of the Carnivorous Plant Newsletter as var. multifida, referring to the description of a 27-point D. binata found by George Ashley and published in a 1975 volume of the Carnivorous Plant Newsletter. Neither of these names were validly published, but again they remain in use among carnivorous plant growers. A final form, known for producing up to 40 terminal leaf points, is frequently titled f. extrema, another name that has never been validly published but remains in use.This represents five-fold dichotomy, with some points undergoing the beginnings of a sixth. The variety D.b. f. extrema is native to Stradbroke Island off the coast of Brisbane, Queensland.

Two cultivars of D. binata have been named. Drosera 'Giant' is a particularly large form of the "var. dichotoma" type and was published by Peter D'Amato in 1998 and registered in 1999. The other, Drosera 'Marston Dragon', was published by Adrian Slack in 1986 and registered in 2001.

== See also ==
- List of Drosera species
- Taxonomy of Drosera
