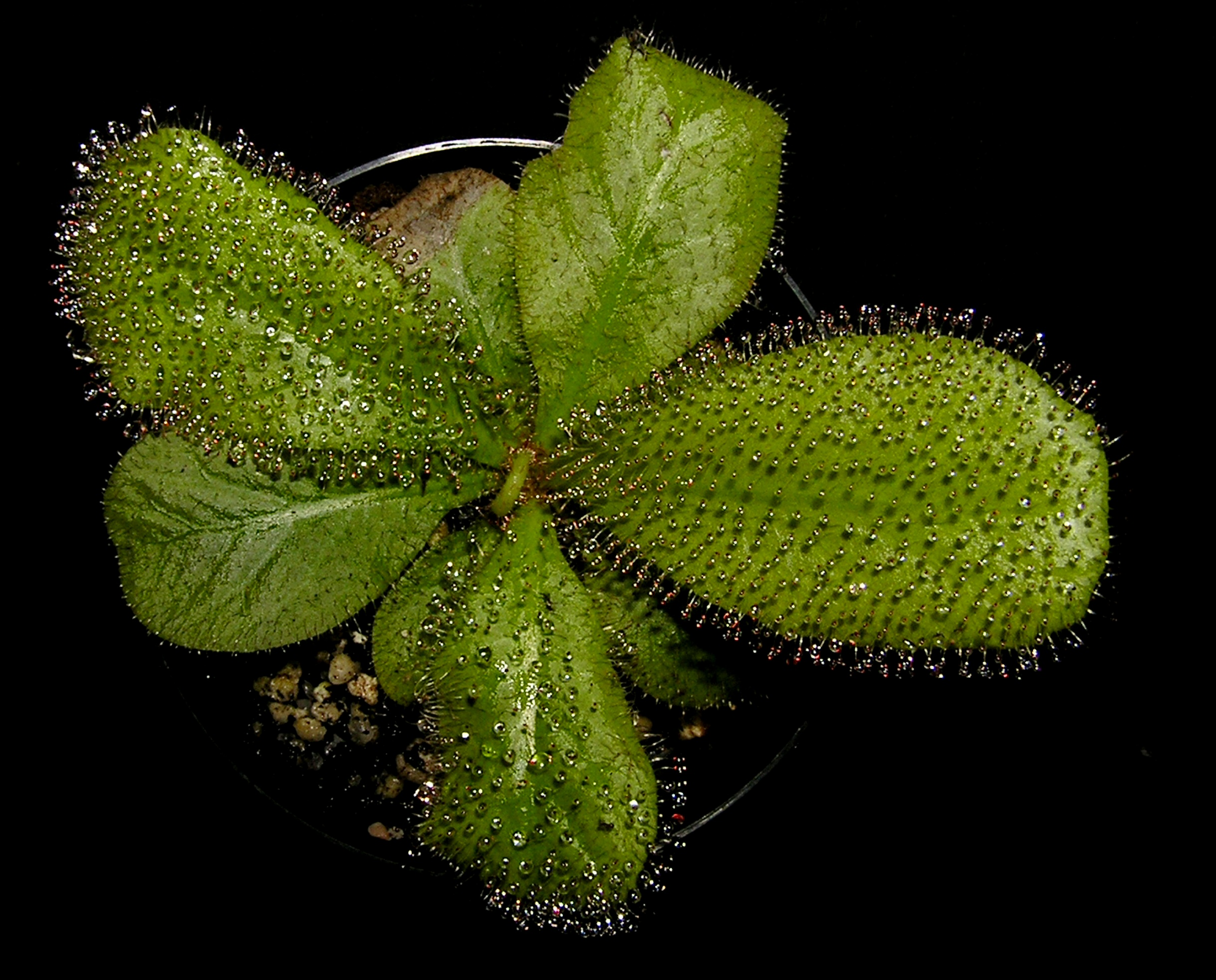

Conservation status
- Vulnerable (NCA)

Scientific classification
- Kingdom: Plantae
- Clade: Tracheophytes
- Clade: Angiosperms
- Clade: Eudicots
- Order: Caryophyllales
- Family: Droseraceae
- Genus: Drosera
- Subgenus: Drosera subg. Drosera
- Section: Drosera sect. Prolifera
- Species: D. schizandra

Binomial name
- Drosera schizandra Diels

= Drosera schizandra =

Species of carnivorous plant

Drosera schizandra is a species of Drosera found in Queensland, Australia. Commonly called the notched sundew or heart-leaf sundew, it has round, oval leaves that sometimes develop notched tips as they grow, giving them a heartlike shape.

Range of D. schizandra in the wild

== See also ==
- List of Drosera species
