= Conran of Orkney =

7th-century bishop of Orkney

Saint Conran Bishop of Orkney
- Born: Scotland
- Residence: Orkney
- Died: Orkney
- Canonized: Pre-congregation
- Feast: 14 February

Saint Conran of Orkney was a 7th-century Bishop of Orkney. His feast day is 14 February.

== Monks of Ramsgate account ==
The Monks of Ramsgate wrote in their Book of Saints (1921),

CONRAN (St.) Bp. (Feb. 14)
(7th cent.) A holy Bishop of the Orkney Islands, a man of austere life and a zealous Pastor of souls, formerly in great veneration in the North of Scotland.

== Butler's account ==
The hagiographer Alban Butler (1710–1773) wrote in his Lives of the Fathers, Martyrs, and Other Principal Saints,

Saint Conran, Bishop of Orkney, C.

The Isles of Orkney are twenty-six in number, besides the lesser, called Holmes, which are uninhabited, and serve only for pasture. The faith was planted here by Saint Palladius, and Saint Sylvester, one of his fellow-labourers, who was appointed by him the first pastor of this church, and was honoured in it on the 5th of February. In these islands formerly stood a great number of holy monasteries, the chief of which was Kirkwall. This place was the bishop’s residence, and is at this day the only remarkable town in these islands. It is situated in the largest of them, which is thirty miles long, called anciently Pomonia, now Mainland. This church is much indebted to Saint Conran, who was bishop here in the seventh century, and whose name, for the austerity of his life, zeal, and eminent sanctity, was no less famous in those parts, so long as the Catholic religion flourished there, than those of Saint Palladius and of Saint Kentigern. The cathedral of Orkney was dedicated under the invocation of Saint Magnus, king of Norway.

== Sources ==
- Butler, Alban (1821), The lives of the fathers, martyrs, and other principal saints, vol. 2, London: John Murphy This article incorporates text from this source, which is in the public domain.
- St. Augustine's Abbey, Ramsgate (1921). The Book of saints : a dictionary of servants of God canonized by the Catholic Church. London: A. & C. Black, ltd. OCLC 671676136. This article incorporates text from this source, which is in the public domain.
