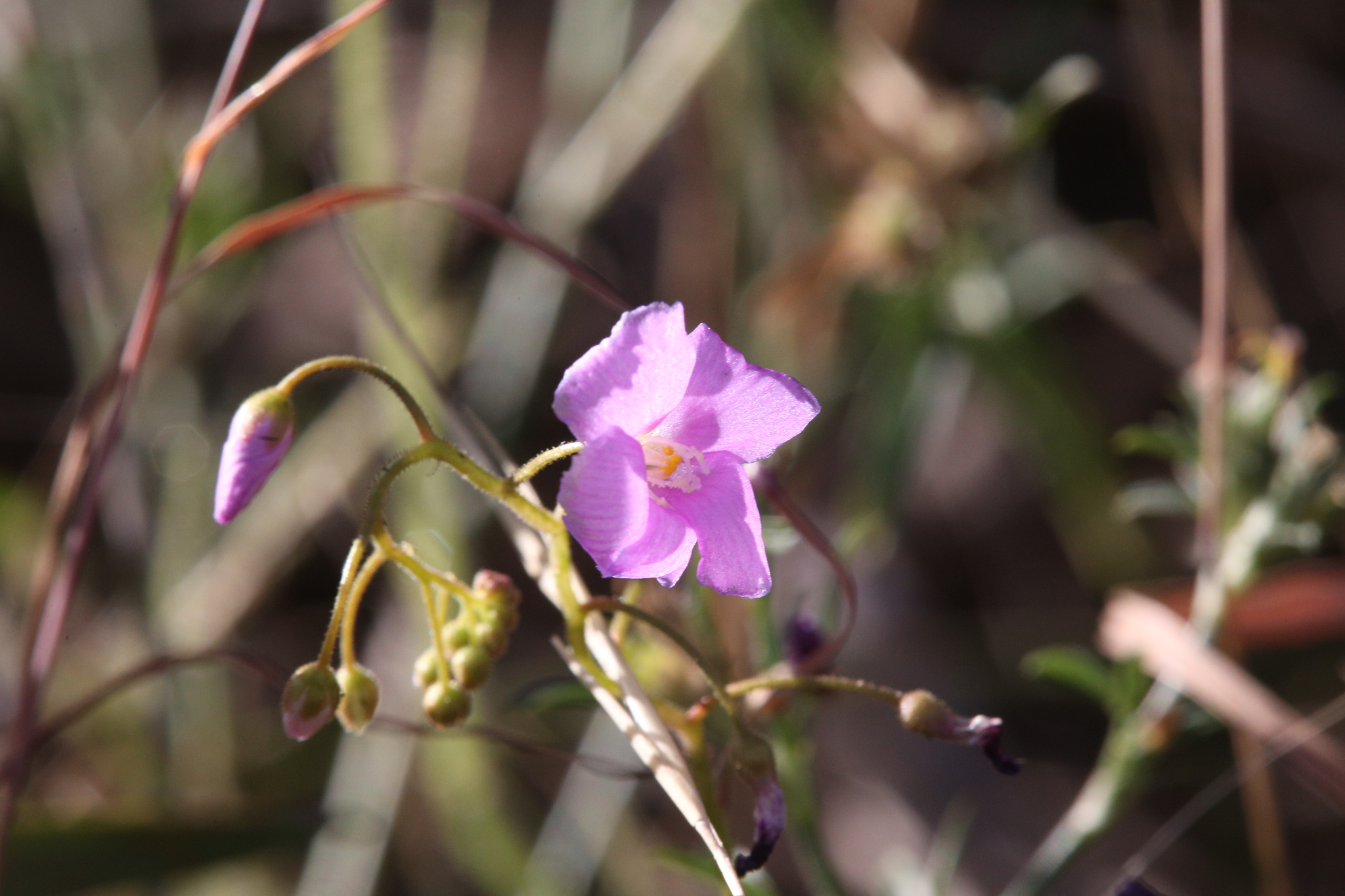

Scientific classification
- Kingdom: Plantae
- Clade: Tracheophytes
- Clade: Angiosperms
- Clade: Eudicots
- Order: Caryophyllales
- Family: Droseraceae
- Genus: Drosera
- Subgenus: Drosera subg. Drosera
- Section: Drosera sect. Arachnopus
- Species: D. margaritacea

Binomial name
- Drosera margaritacea T.Krueger & A.Fleischm.

= Drosera margaritacea =

Species of carnivorous plant

Drosera margaritacea is a species of sundew endemic to the Kimberley region of Western Australia. It was first described by Thilo Krueger and Andreas Fleischmann in 2021. Like other members of Drosera sect. Arachnopus it is an annual therophyte.

The specific epithet margaritacea is from the Latin margaritaceus meaning 'pearly / pearl-bearing'. This refers to the unique milky-white stalked mucilage glands found on the short petiole of this species, and also to a rounded swelling at the tip of the anther connective.
