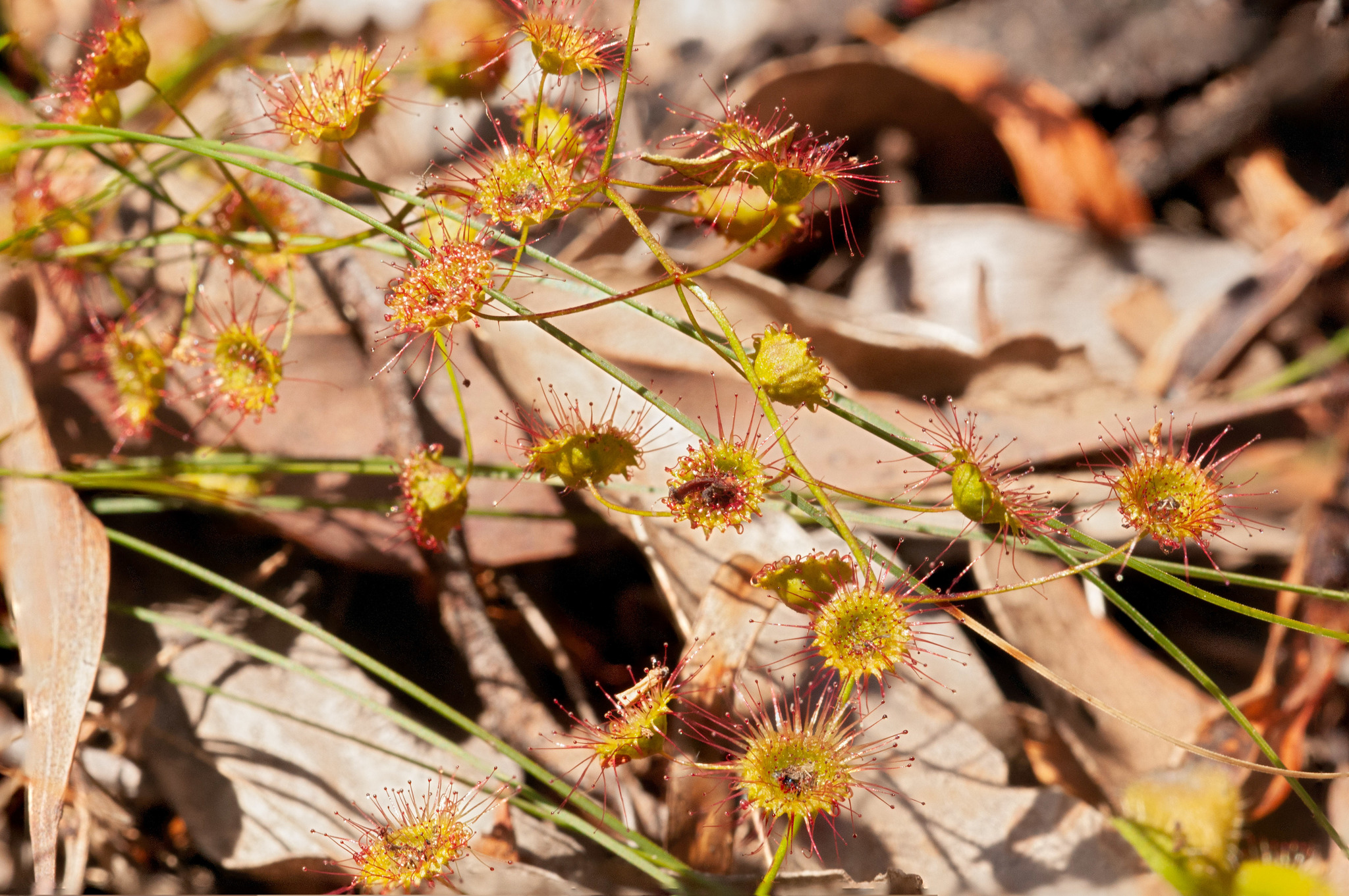

Scientific classification
- Kingdom: Plantae
- Clade: Tracheophytes
- Clade: Angiosperms
- Clade: Eudicots
- Order: Caryophyllales
- Family: Droseraceae
- Genus: Drosera
- Species: D. planchonii

Binomial name
- Drosera planchonii Hook.f. ex Planch.

Synonyms
- Drosera macrantha subsp. planchonii (Hook.f. ex Planch.) N.G.Marchant; Drosera menziesi var. albiflora Benth.; Sondera planchonii (Hook.f. ex Planch.) Chrtek & Slavíková

= Drosera planchonii =

Species of carnivorous plant

Drosera planchonii or Climbing Sundew is a species of carnivorous plant endemic to Australia. It was first formally named in 1848.

== Gallery ==
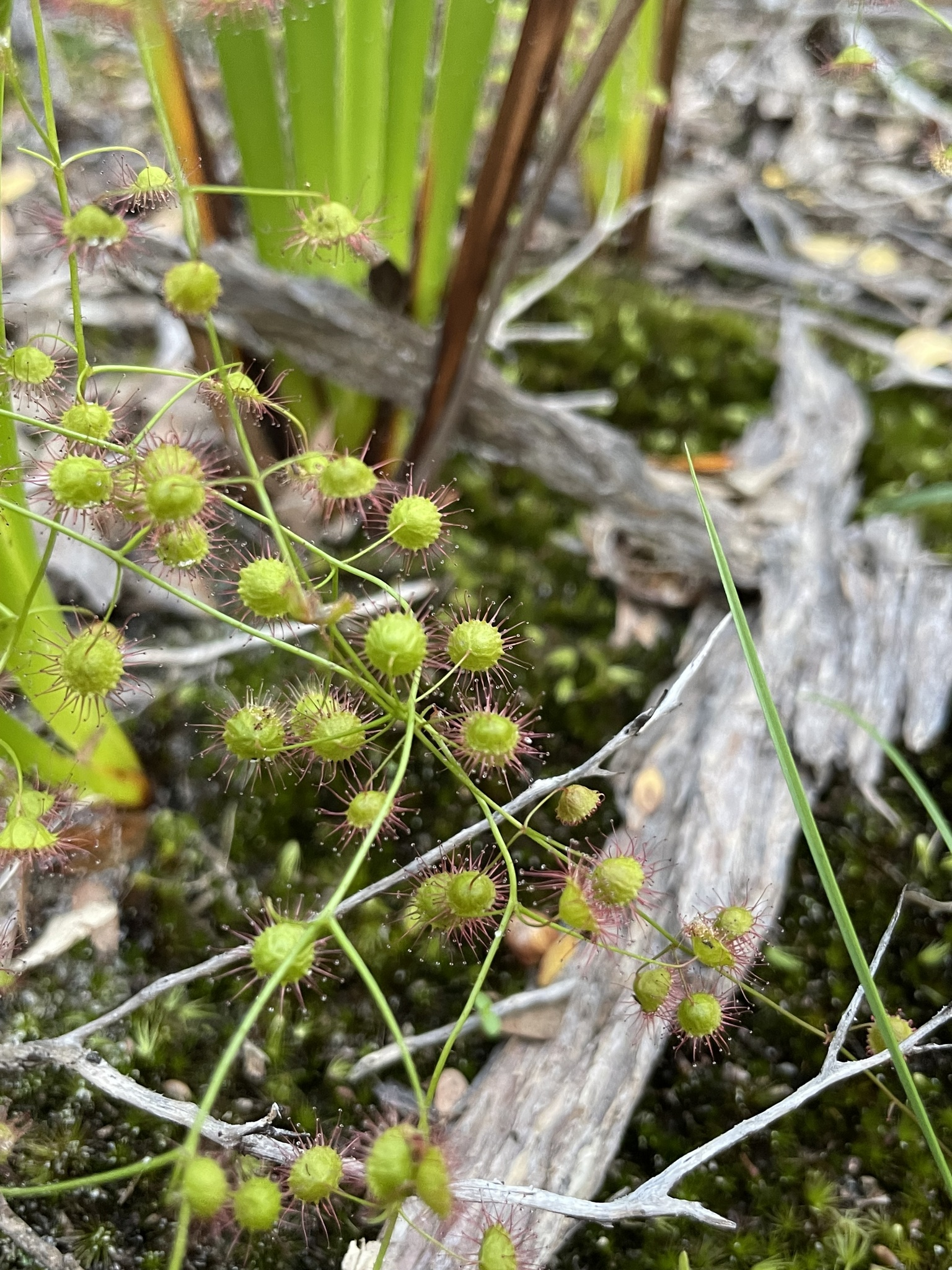
Drosera planchonii showing climbing habit.
