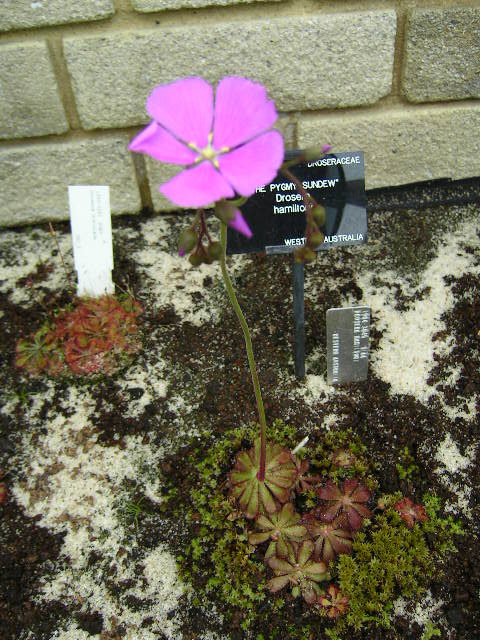

Scientific classification
- Kingdom: Plantae
- Clade: Tracheophytes
- Clade: Angiosperms
- Clade: Eudicots
- Order: Caryophyllales
- Family: Droseraceae
- Genus: Drosera
- Subgenus: Drosera subg. Stelogyne (Diels) Schlauer
- Species: D. hamiltonii

Binomial name
- Drosera hamiltonii C.R.P.Andrews

= Drosera hamiltonii =

Species of carnivorous plant

Drosera hamiltonii, the rosy sundew, is a small, compact species in the carnivorous plant genus Drosera and is the only species in the monotypic subgenus Stelogyne. The glandular leaves are about 2 cm (0.8 in) long and arranged in a rosette. In November and December, pink flowers on 30 cm (12 in) tall scapes bloom. It is endemic to coastal swamps in south-west Western Australia. It was first described by Cecil Rollo Payton Andrews in 1903 and placed in section Stelogyne as the only species by Ludwig Diels in 1906. In 1994, Rüdiger Seine and Wilhelm Barthlott suggested D. hamiltonii belonged in their section Drosera, reducing section Stelogyne to synonymy with section Drosera. In 1996, Jan Schlauer revised the genus classification and elevated section Stelogyne to a subgenus, arguing that the unique fused styles requires segregation at more than a sectional rank.

== See also ==
- List of Drosera species
