= Drosera atrata =

Scientific classification
- Kingdom: Plantae
- Clade: Embryophytes
- Clade: Tracheophytes
- Clade: Angiosperms
- Clade: Eudicots
- Order: Caryophyllales
- Family: Droseraceae
- Genus: Drosera
- Subgenus: Drosera subg. Ergaleium
- Section: Drosera sect. Ergaleium
- Species: D. atrata

Binomial name
- Drosera atrata T.Krueger, A.Fleischm. & Bourke

Species of flowering plant

Drosera atrata is a species of tuberous sundew in the family Droseraceae. It is endemic to Western Australia.
