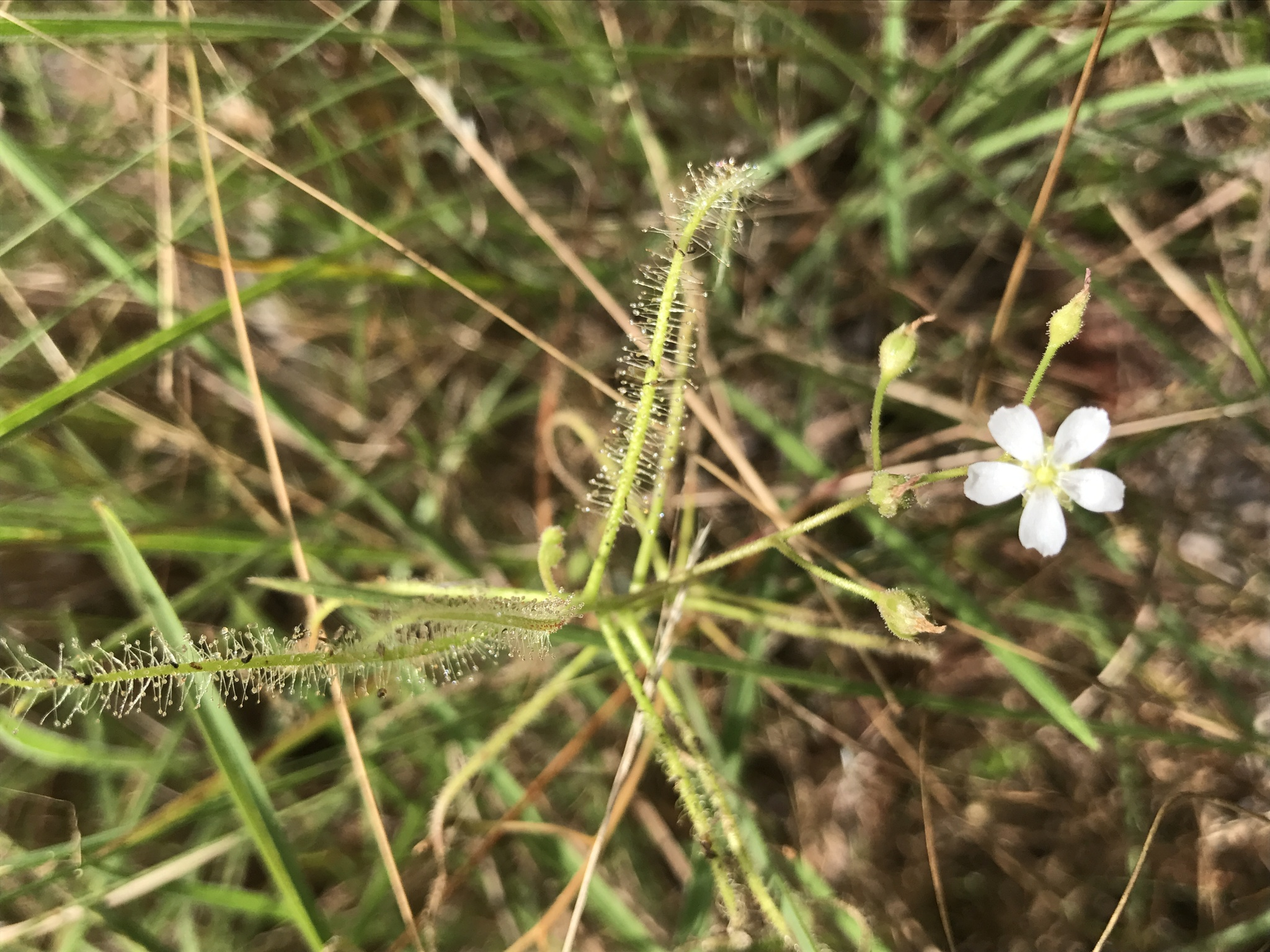

Scientific classification
- Kingdom: Plantae
- Clade: Tracheophytes
- Clade: Angiosperms
- Clade: Eudicots
- Order: Caryophyllales
- Family: Droseraceae
- Genus: Drosera
- Subgenus: Drosera subg. Drosera
- Section: Drosera sect. Arachnopus
- Species: D. serpens

Binomial name
- Drosera serpens Planch.

= Drosera serpens =

Species of carnivorous plant

Drosera serpens is a species of sundew native to southeast Asia and tropical northern Australia. It was first described by Planchon in 1848. Like other members of Drosera sect. Arachnopus it is an annual therophyte.

The species name serpens is from Latin meaning 'snake' or 'creeping thing' and refers to the scrambling habit of the plant.
