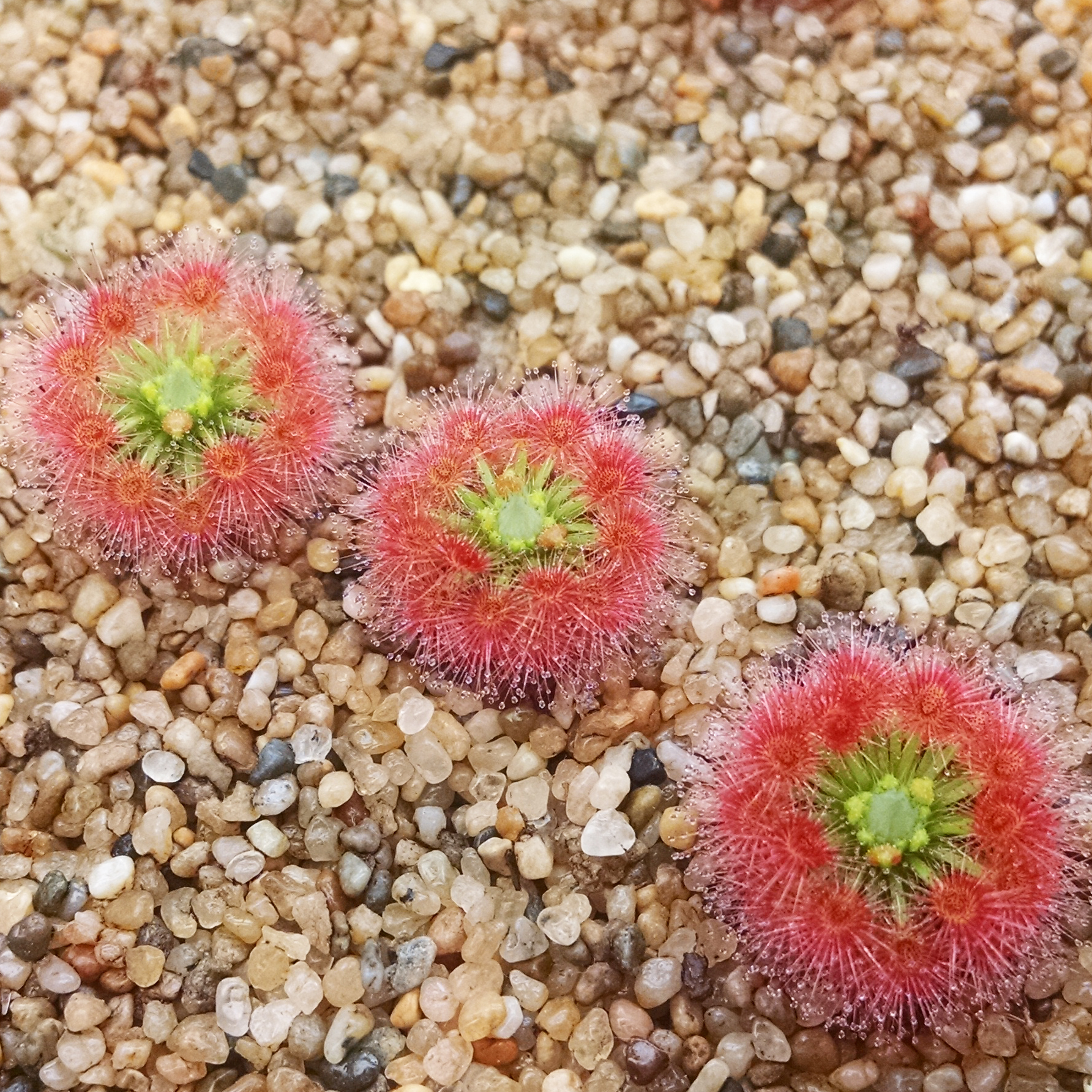

Scientific classification
- Kingdom: Plantae
- Clade: Embryophytes
- Clade: Tracheophytes
- Clade: Spermatophytes
- Clade: Angiosperms
- Clade: Eudicots
- Order: Caryophyllales
- Family: Droseraceae
- Genus: Drosera
- Subgenus: Drosera subg. Bryastrum
- Section: Drosera sect. Lamprolepis
- Species: D. paleacea

Binomial name
- Drosera paleacea DC.
- Wild range (in red)

= Drosera paleacea =

Pygmy carnivorous plant from western Australia, trapping insects with sticky mucilage

Drosera paleacea is a species of pygmy sundew from Western Australia.
