= Laundon =

Laundon is a surname. Notable people with the surname include:

- G.F. Laundon (1938–1984), New Zealand-based mycologist and plant pathologist
- Jack Laundon (1934–2016), British lichenologist and mycologist
