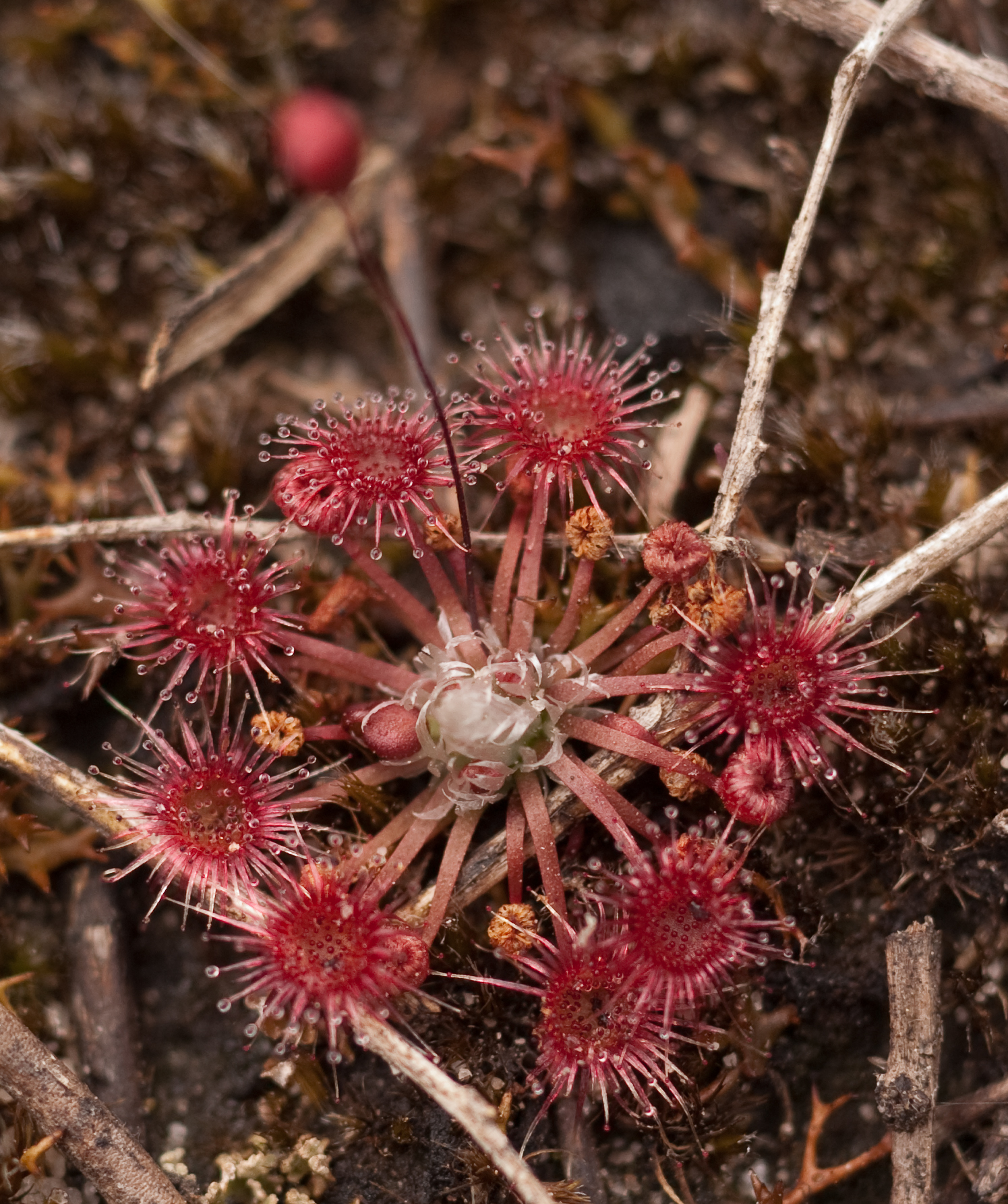
- Early summer growth of Drosera pygmaea at the Peter Murrell Reserve, near Hobart, Tasmania, Australia.

Scientific classification
- Kingdom: Plantae
- Clade: Tracheophytes
- Clade: Angiosperms
- Clade: Eudicots
- Order: Caryophyllales
- Family: Droseraceae
- Genus: Drosera
- Subgenus: Drosera subg. Ergaleium
- Section: Drosera sect. Bryastrum; Planch.
- Species: D. pygmaea

Binomial name
- Drosera pygmaea DC. (1824)

Synonyms
- Drosera pusilla auct. non H.B.K.: R.Br. ex Hook.f. (1840); Drosera pygmaea auct. non DC.: Lehm. (1845) [=D. paleacea]

= Drosera pygmaea =

Species of carnivorous plant

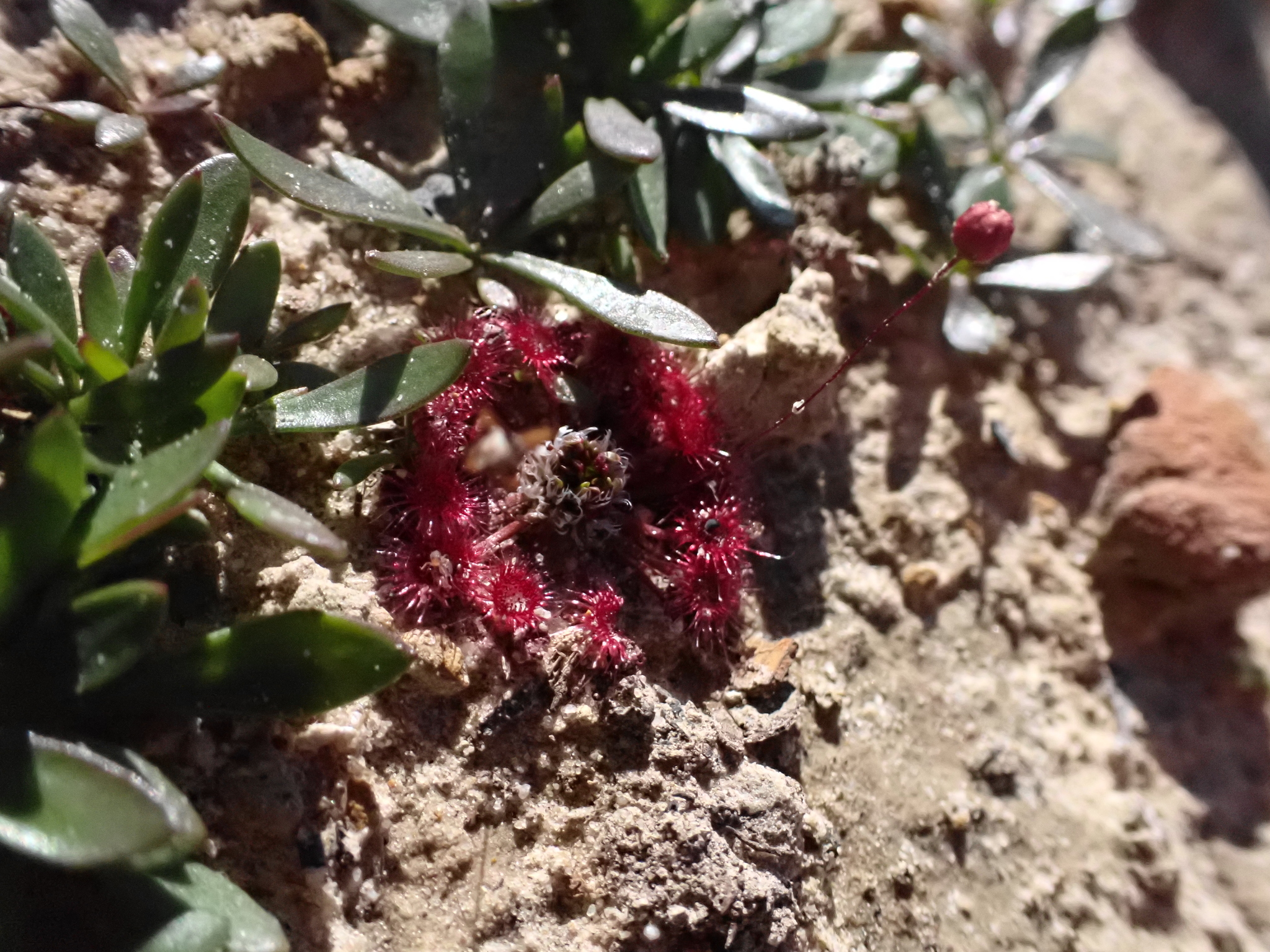
Drosera pygmaea growing in the Grampians National Park, near Stawell, Victoria, Australia.

Drosera pygmaea is a carnivorous, rosette-forming biennial or annual species of herb native to Australia and New Zealand. The specific epithet, which translates as "dwarf" from Latin, is a reference to the very small size of this plant, which grows to between 8 and 18 mm in diameter. Small, pale flowers are produced at the ends of 1- to 3-inch stems. It is perhaps the most well-known of the pygmy sundews. Within New Zealand D. pygmaea is found in a wide range of habitats from coastal to subalpine, it requires open ground as it is easily outcompeted from taller species.

Range of D. pygmaea in Australia in the wild.

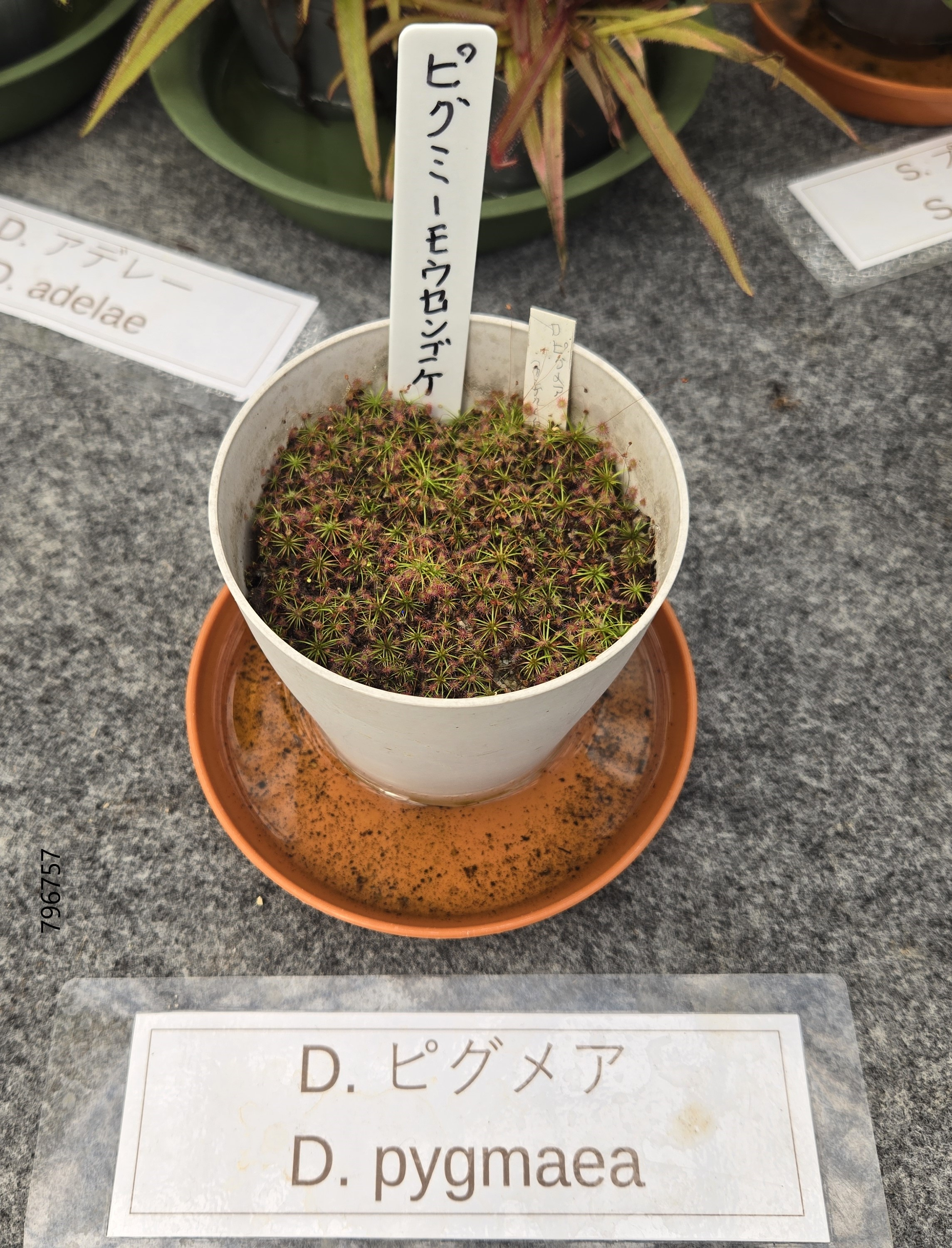
D. pygmaea in a greenhouse.
