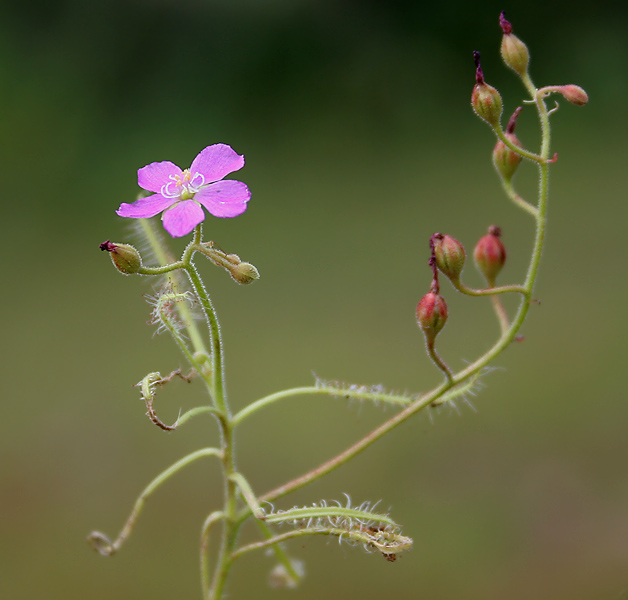
- D. indica in Narsapur, Medak district, India

Conservation status
- Least Concern (IUCN 3.1)

Scientific classification
- Kingdom: Plantae
- Clade: Tracheophytes
- Clade: Angiosperms
- Clade: Eudicots
- Order: Caryophyllales
- Family: Droseraceae
- Genus: Drosera
- Subgenus: Drosera subg. Drosera
- Section: Drosera sect. Arachnopus
- Species: D. indica

Binomial name
- Drosera indica L.

= Drosera indica =

Species of plant

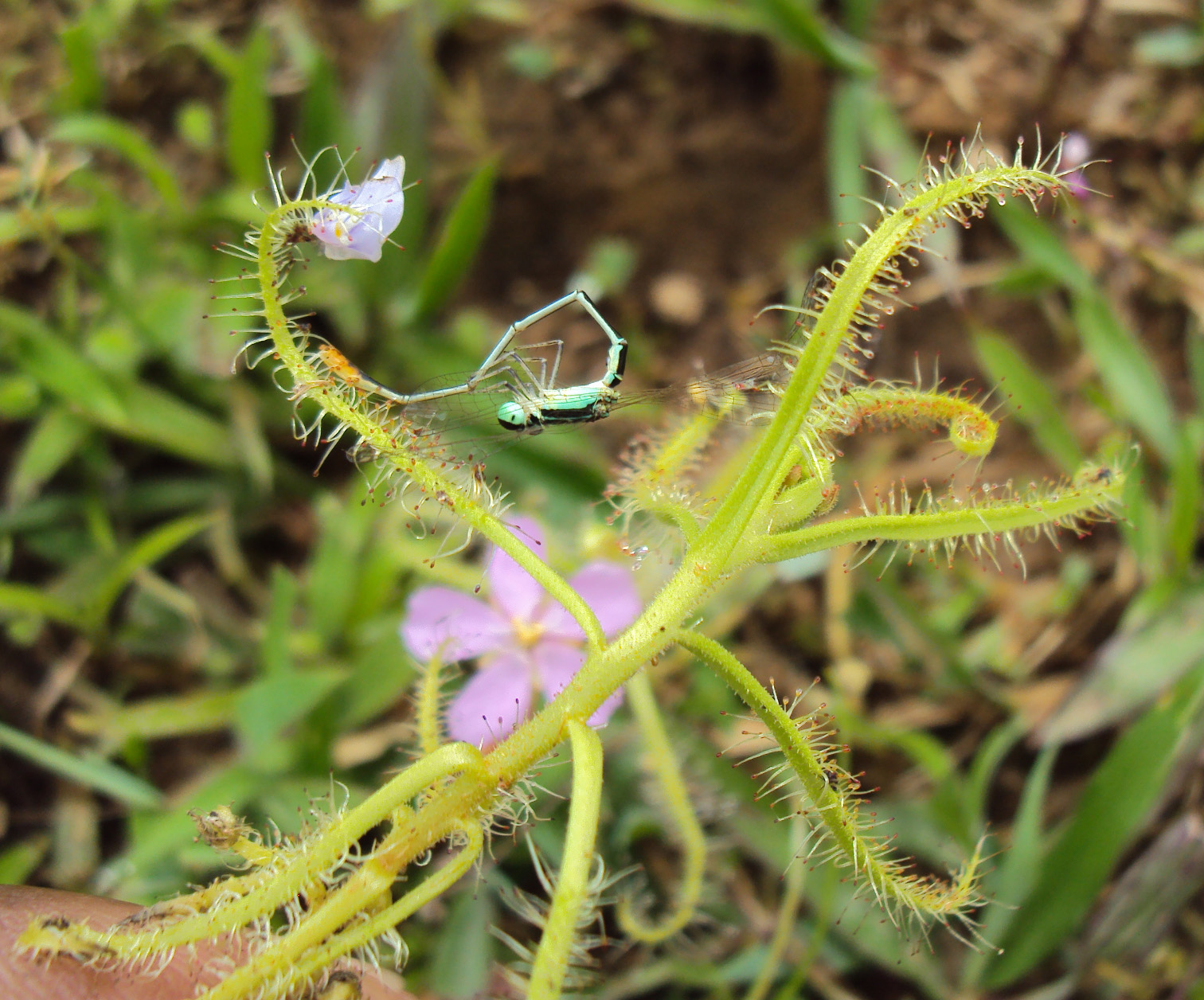
A damselfly is seen captured by a Drosera indica plant at Madayipara

Drosera indica, sometimes known as the Indian sundew, is a species of sundew native to tropical and southern Africa, Madagascar and tropical and subtropical Asia. It was first described by Carl Linnaeus in his Species Plantarum in 1753. Until the early 21st century it was mostly considered a highly variable species with a wide distribution including Australia, but since 2000 several distinct species have been separated from D. indica within Drosera section Arachnopus, which is often referred to as the ‘Drosera indica complex’. Many of these species are endemic to Australia, but D. indica itself is now widely considered to be absent from that country.

== Description ==
Drosera indica is an unbranched, annual herbaceous plant, supported by a fibrous root system and reaching a height of 5–50 cm (2–20 in). Leaves are narrowly linear, up to 10 cm [4 in] long with 1–1.5 cm [0.4–0.6 in] pedicels. Young plants stand upright, while older ones form scrambling stems with only the newest growth exhibiting an upright habit. The plant can be yellow-green to maroon in color. Flower petals can be white, pink, orange, or purple. Its chromosome count is 2n=28. A red-tentacled dwarf form in Thailand has greater tolerance to drought compared to the taller form that has white tentacles. Increased shading caused by overgrowth of neighbouring plants of D. indica reduces both growth and seed production.

== Uses and threats ==
Drosera indica contains several chemicals that have been studied for potential pharmaceutical applications, such as plumbagin and flavonoids including quercetin. European countries import D. indica and D. burmanii from Asia to prepare an Ayurvedic product called "Herba Drosera" thereby protecting their native D. rotundifolia from large-scale collection. Collection of D. indica for this purpose is likely a major threat to the species in countries like India where states like Andhra Pradesh have listed the species as vulnerable and likely endangered in the state.
