= Carnivorous Plants of Australia =

Work by Allen Lowrie

- Covers of the three hardback volumes, showing Drosera species and Cephalotus
- Author: Allen Lowrie
- Language: English
- Publisher: University of Western Australia Press
- Publication date: 1987 (Volume 1); 1989 (Volume 2); 1998 (Volume 3)
- Media type: Print (hardcover, softcover; Volume 3 hardcover only)
- Pages: xxvi + 202 (Volume 1) xxxviii + 202 (Volume 2); 288 (Volume 3)
- ISBN: 0855642548 (Volume 1); 0855642998 (Volume 2); 1875560599 (Volume 3)
- OCLC: 17554752

Carnivorous Plants of Australia is a three-volume work on carnivorous plants by Allen Lowrie. The three tomes were published in 1987, 1989, and 1998, by University of Western Australia Press.

An entirely updated three-volume work by Lowrie was published by Redfern Natural History Productions in December 2013 as Carnivorous Plants of Australia Magnum Opus.

== Content ==
The first volume deals exclusively with tuberous sundews (genus Drosera). The second is devoted to pygmy sundews, but also includes three tuberous species described since the publication of the first volume, as well as two other sundews that do not fit elsewhere (D. glanduligera and D. hamiltonii). The final volume includes the remaining sundews of Australia, together with native species of Aldrovanda, Byblis, Cephalotus, Nepenthes, and Utricularia. Each species is given a four-page treatment, with one page for a botanical description, one for a line drawing of the author's creation, one for a distribution map, and one for assorted colour photographs.

== Reviews ==
=== Volume 1 ===
Martin Cheek reviewed the first volume for the March 1988 issue of the Carnivorous Plant Newsletter (CPN). He compared it to Neville Graeme Marchant and Alex George's 1982 treatment of tuberous sundews in Flora Australia (F.A.):

Each plant is very clearly described in a page of text followed by a few interesting paragraphs on its most outstanding features and how to tell it apart from its closest relatives. There follows a full plate of the most superb drawings, far better, more beautiful and comprehensive than the F.A., a distribution map (needless to say, ten times better than F.A.) and outstanding colour plates showing, separately, habit and habitat and a close-up of the flowers.

Cheek identified a number of "[m]inor errors" in the text, including the species keys and glossary, but wrote that "we must not be over critical". He concluded: "This book is essential reading as the major reference work on Australian tuberous sundews: buy it."

=== Volume 2 ===
The second volume was reviewed by Donald Schnell in the March–June 1990 issue of the CPN:

The descriptions are all excellent, as are the line drawings and range maps. The photos are true to color, sharply printed, and for the most part show what they are intended to.

Schnell suggested that some of the book's smaller images would benefit from enlargement, finding certain morphological details difficult to discern. He added that "some might question" the inclusion of many undescribed taxa and several newly described species of tuberous sundews, the latter appearing somewhat out-of-place in a book otherwise devoted to pygmy sundews.

Martin Cheek provided a more in-depth review of volume 2 for the September–December 1990 issue of the CPN. He wrote that the book puts all other works on pygmy sundews "into the shade", with comprehensive treatment of every species known at the time. Minor criticisms included the "woolliness" of certain glossary definitions (which "has unfortunate consequences in the descriptions that follow"), issues with the main key, a lack of ranges for many measurements, truncated peduncles in some line drawings, and no mention of bract morphology in the species descriptions. More serious criticism was levelled at the inclusion of numerous informally named taxa and at Lowrie's reliance on original descriptions (without examination of type material) in making certain taxonomic determinations, particularly with respect to the confused D. omissa. Cheek also added: "For the grower of pygmy Drosera, a major disappointment is that the numerous cultivar names that so many pygmy sundew species, of direct wild origin, have been traded under for 10 years or more [...] are not accounted for, nor mentioned anywhere in the text." Summarising, Cheek wrote:

Even in view of the reservations expressed above, the keys, descriptions, maps and illustrations are vastly superior to those of previous authors. The works of Erickson and Marchant & George must now be considered completely out-of-date.

=== Volume 3 ===
Barry Rice gave a positive appraisal of the third volume in the September 1999 issue of the CPN, writing: "If you are interested at all in Australian carnivorous plants you should buy this book!". He continued:

The descriptive text sections are good and the botanical drawings are well executed and clear, although many of the plates have much blank space that could have been used for additional sketches. (For example, Lowrie unfortunately did not include gemmae sketches for the new pygmy sundews.) The photography is excellent—as in his first two volumes Lowrie skillfully uses depth-of-field and background choices to highlight the plants. The addition of microphotographs is welcome.

Rice wrote that the range maps "are fine, although not particularly detailed" and considered the alphabetical arrangement of species, which differed from the first two volumes, "inconvenient" at times. Rice pointed out the omission of many Utricularia species ("only nineteen species are described, even though more than fifty species occur in Australia") and felt that the four-pages-per-species format was inadequate for treating some of the more "complicated taxa", like D. binata, U. dichotoma, and especially D. peltata (of which "only the Western Australia type was ever mentioned"—in the first volume).
