= Allen Lowrie =

Western Australian botanist (1948–2021)

Allen Lowrie (10 October 1948 - 30 August 2021) was a Western Australian botanist. He was recognised for his expertise on the genera Drosera and Stylidium.

Lowrie, originally a businessman and inventor, first experienced the carnivorous flora of Western Australia in the late sixties and studied it as an amateur. Over time, his hobby turned into a profession and Lowrie discovered and described numerous species (especially Drosera, Byblis and Utricularia), partly together with Neville Marchant. From 1987 to 1998 he published Carnivorous Plants of Australia in three volumes. A completely revised second edition, entitled Carnivorous Plants of Australia Magnum Opus was published in 2014.

The standard author abbreviation Lowrie is used to indicate this person as the author when citing a botanical name.
