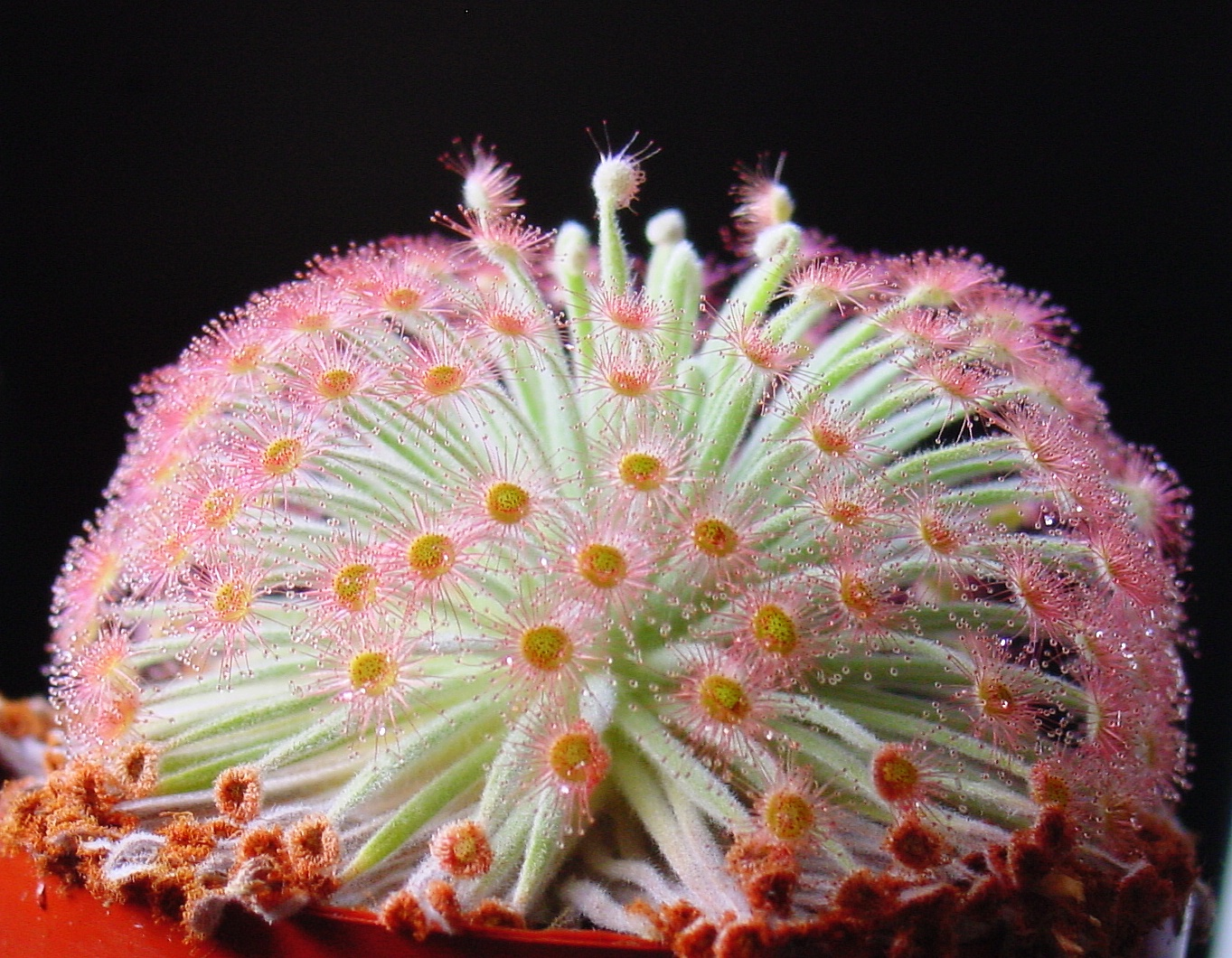
- Drosera derbyensis, a member of subgenus Lasiocephala

Scientific classification
- Kingdom: Plantae
- Clade: Tracheophytes
- Clade: Angiosperms
- Clade: Eudicots
- Order: Caryophyllales
- Family: Droseraceae
- Genus: Drosera
- Subgenus: Drosera subg. Lasiocephala (Planch.) J.Schlauer

Type species
- D. petiolaris R.Br. ex DC.

Species
- Drosera banksii Drosera brevicornis Drosera broomensis Drosera caduca Drosera darwinensis Drosera derbyensis Drosera dilatatopetiolaris Drosera falconeri Drosera fulva Drosera kenneallyi Drosera lanata Drosera ordensis Drosera paradoxa Drosera petiolaris

Synonyms
- D. sect. Lasiocephala Planch.; D. ser. Lasiocephala (Planch.) Diels

= Drosera subg. Lasiocephala =

Subgenus of plants

Drosera subg. Lasiocephala, sometimes collectively known as the petiolaris-complex, is a subgenus of 14 species in the genus Drosera. These species are distinguished by their subpeltate to peltate lamina.

== Taxonomy ==
The subgenus was first formally described by Jules Émile Planchon in 1848 as a section. Planchon included the species D. banksii in his arrangement, but it has been argued that D. banksii belongs in a clade with the more-closely allied D. subtilis. Ludwig Diels reclassified the genus in his 1906 monograph of the family and recognizing this taxon as a series under section Rossolis. In 1996, taxonomist Jan Schlauer argued for the recognition of this taxon at the rank of subgenus, noting that these closely related species share many affinities with subgenus Drosera but are different enough to warrant subgeneric status. All species in this subgenus are native to northern Australia except for D. petiolaris, which is more widely distributed to as far as New Guinea. The plants in this subgenus or petiolaris-complex mostly look like variations of the eponymous D. petiolaris.

Image	Scientific name	Distribution
	Drosera banksii R.Br. ex DC.	northern Australia (Queensland, the Northern Territory, and Western Australia) and Southeast Asia (Papua New Guinea and Western New Guinea).
	Drosera brevicornis Lowrie	Australia(Northern Territory and Western Australia. )
	Drosera broomensis Lowrie	Western Australia.
	Drosera caduca Lowrie	Western Australia.
	Drosera darwinensis Lowrie	Northern Territory
	Drosera derbyensis Lowrie	Western Australia.
	Drosera dilatatopetiolaris K.Kondo	Western Australia and the Northern Territory.
	Drosera falconeri Tsang ex K.Kondo	Northern Territory
	Drosera fulva Planch.	Northern Territory
	Drosera kenneallyi Lowrie	Western Australia
	Drosera lanata K.Kondo	Northern Territory and Queensland
	Drosera ordensis Lowrie	Western Australia
	Drosera paradoxa Lowrie	Northern Territory and Western Australia.
	Drosera petiolaris	Western Australia, the Northern Territory, and Queensland, and New Guinea;

== See also ==
- List of Drosera species
- Taxonomy of Drosera
