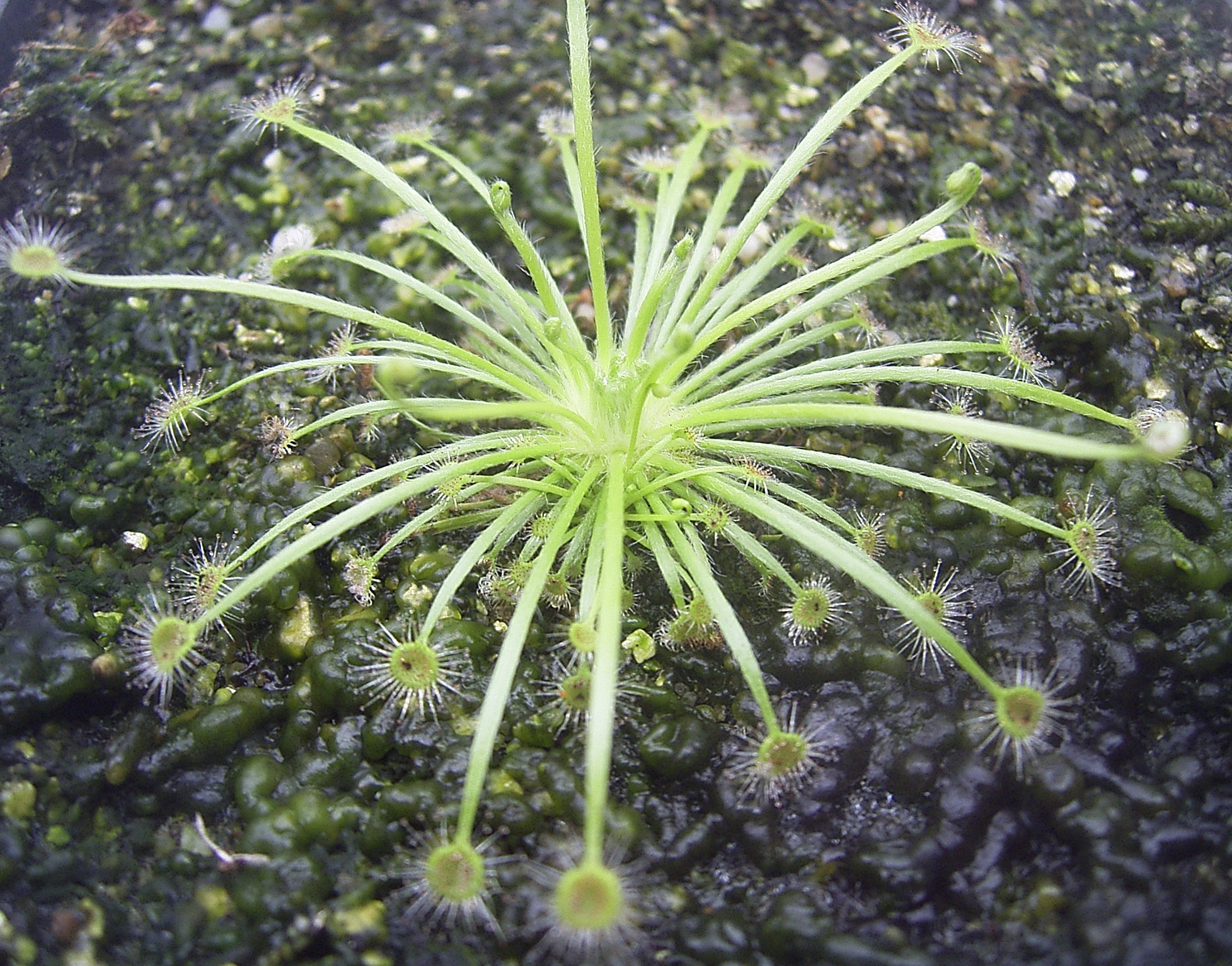

Conservation status
- Least Concern (IUCN 3.1)

Scientific classification
- Kingdom: Plantae
- Clade: Tracheophytes
- Clade: Angiosperms
- Clade: Eudicots
- Order: Caryophyllales
- Family: Droseraceae
- Genus: Drosera
- Subgenus: Drosera subg. Lasiocephala
- Species: D. broomensis

Binomial name
- Drosera broomensis Lowrie

= Drosera broomensis =

Species of flowering plant

Drosera broomensis is a small, perennial carnivorous plant in the genus Drosera that is endemic to Western Australia.

== Description ==
Its leaves are arranged in a small, leafy rosette, from which one to four inflorescences emerge. It produces white flowers in February and March. D. broomensis grows in sandy soils to the north and northeast of Broome in the Kimberley region.

== Taxonomy ==
It was first described by Allen Lowrie in 1996, though earlier specimens from as early as 1891 had been collected. The specific epithet broomensis refers to the region in which it grows. It is closely related to Drosera petiolaris and differs from other related species by its glabrous inflorescence.

== See also ==
- List of Drosera species
- Taxonomy of Drosera
