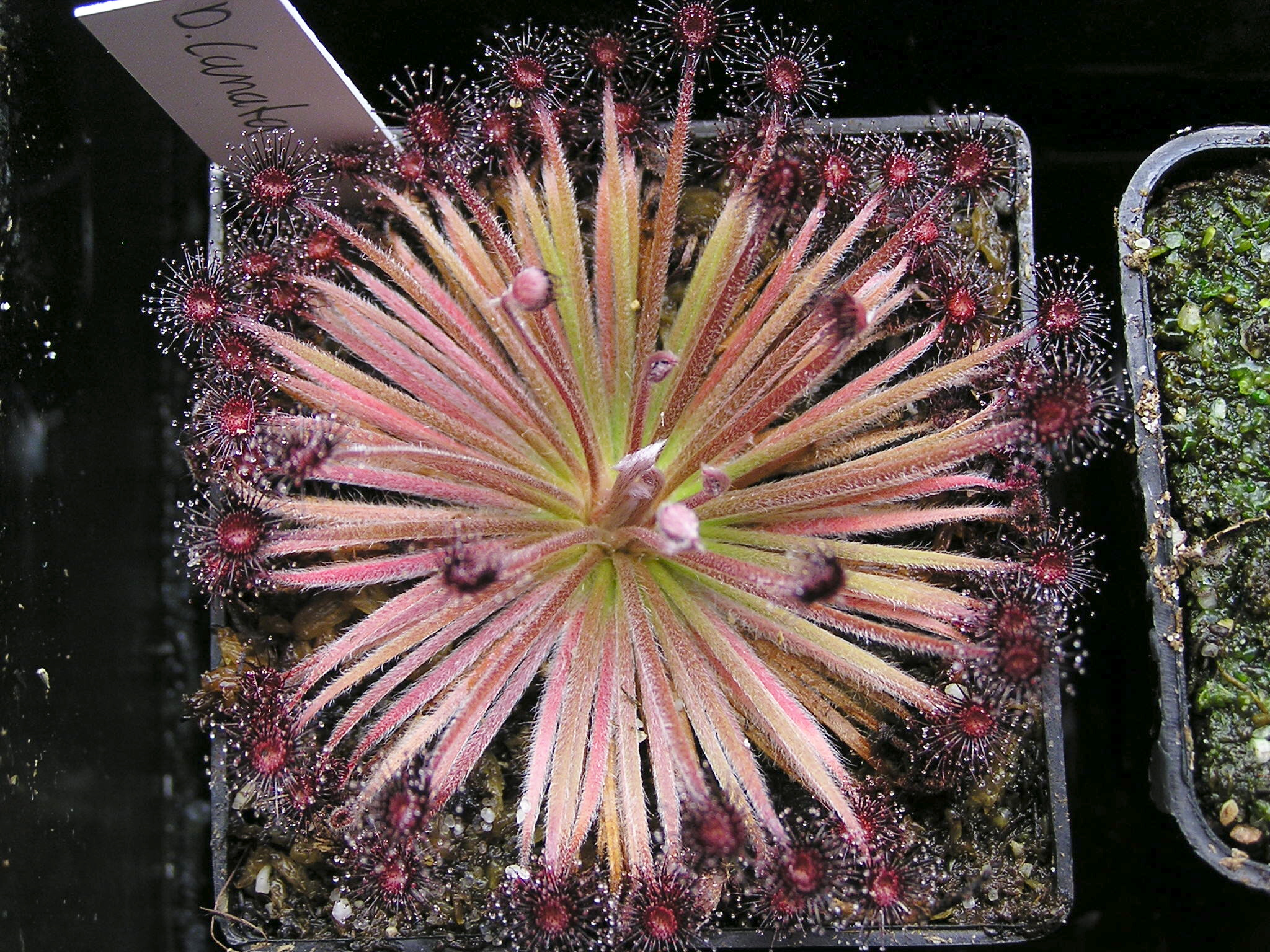
- In cultivation

Scientific classification
- Kingdom: Plantae
- Clade: Tracheophytes
- Clade: Angiosperms
- Clade: Eudicots
- Order: Caryophyllales
- Family: Droseraceae
- Genus: Drosera
- Subgenus: Drosera subg. Lasiocephala
- Species: D. lanata

Binomial name
- Drosera lanata K.Kondo
- Distribution of D. lanata in Australia

Synonyms
- D. petiolaris var. conferta Domin

= Drosera lanata =

Species of carnivorous plant

Drosera lanata is a carnivorous plant in the genus Drosera and is endemic to the Northern Territory and Queensland in Australia. Its leaves are arranged in a compact basal rosette. Narrow linear petioles less than 2 mm wide emerge from the center of the rosette and hold carnivorous leaves at the end. Both petioles and the center of the rosette are densely covered in silvery dendritic hairs. These dendritic hairs afford the plant insulation and allow it to trap morning dew for additional moisture during the dry season. The leaf lamina is maroon-red and 2 mm long by 2.5 mm wide.

Drosera lanata was first formally described by Katsuhiko Kondo in 1984 when he authored three new species of the D. petiolaris complex. The type specimen was collected near Mareeba on the Cape York Peninsula on 28 March 1982.

== See also ==
- List of Drosera species
- Taxonomy of Drosera
