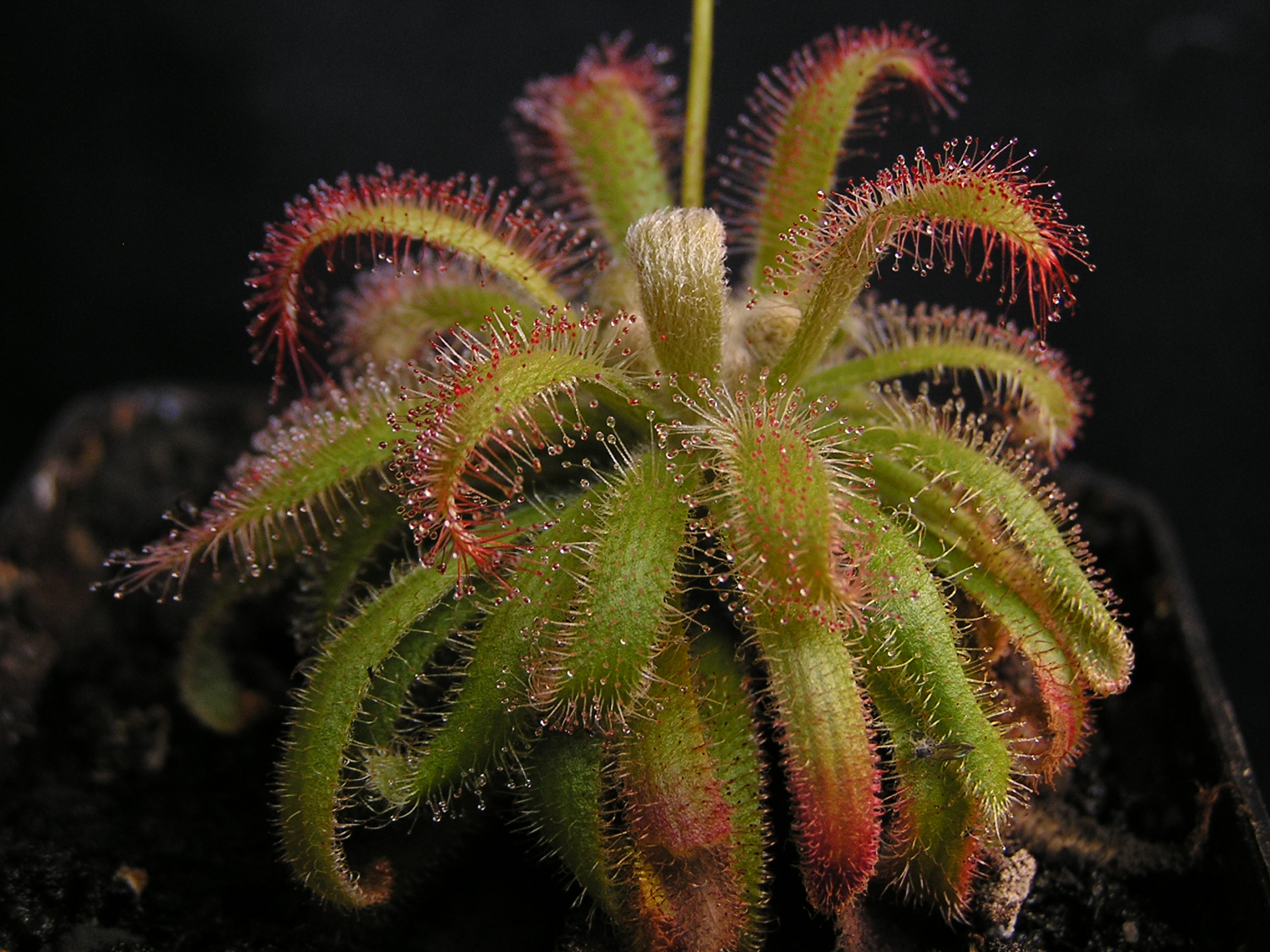

Scientific classification
- Kingdom: Plantae
- Clade: Tracheophytes
- Clade: Angiosperms
- Clade: Eudicots
- Order: Caryophyllales
- Family: Droseraceae
- Genus: Drosera
- Subgenus: Drosera subg. Drosera
- Section: Drosera sect. Drosera
- Species: D. graomogolensis

Binomial name
- Drosera graomogolensis T.Silva

= Drosera graomogolensis =

Species of carnivorous plant

Drosera graomogolensis is a carnivorous plant species native to the State Minas Gerais in Brazil and is now cultivated as an ornamental in Europe. In Brazil, it grows in the campos rupestres habitat.

Drosera graomogolensis is a herb up to 34 cm tall. Leaves are wine-red, forming a basal rosette, up to 3.5 cm long and 6.5 cm broad, covered with sticky glandular hairs on the upper surface. The plant produces 1 or 2 flowering stalks, each with 10–16 large pinkish-violet flowers.

The species is named for the type locale, Grão-Mogol.

== See also ==
- List of Drosera species
- Taxonomy of Drosera
