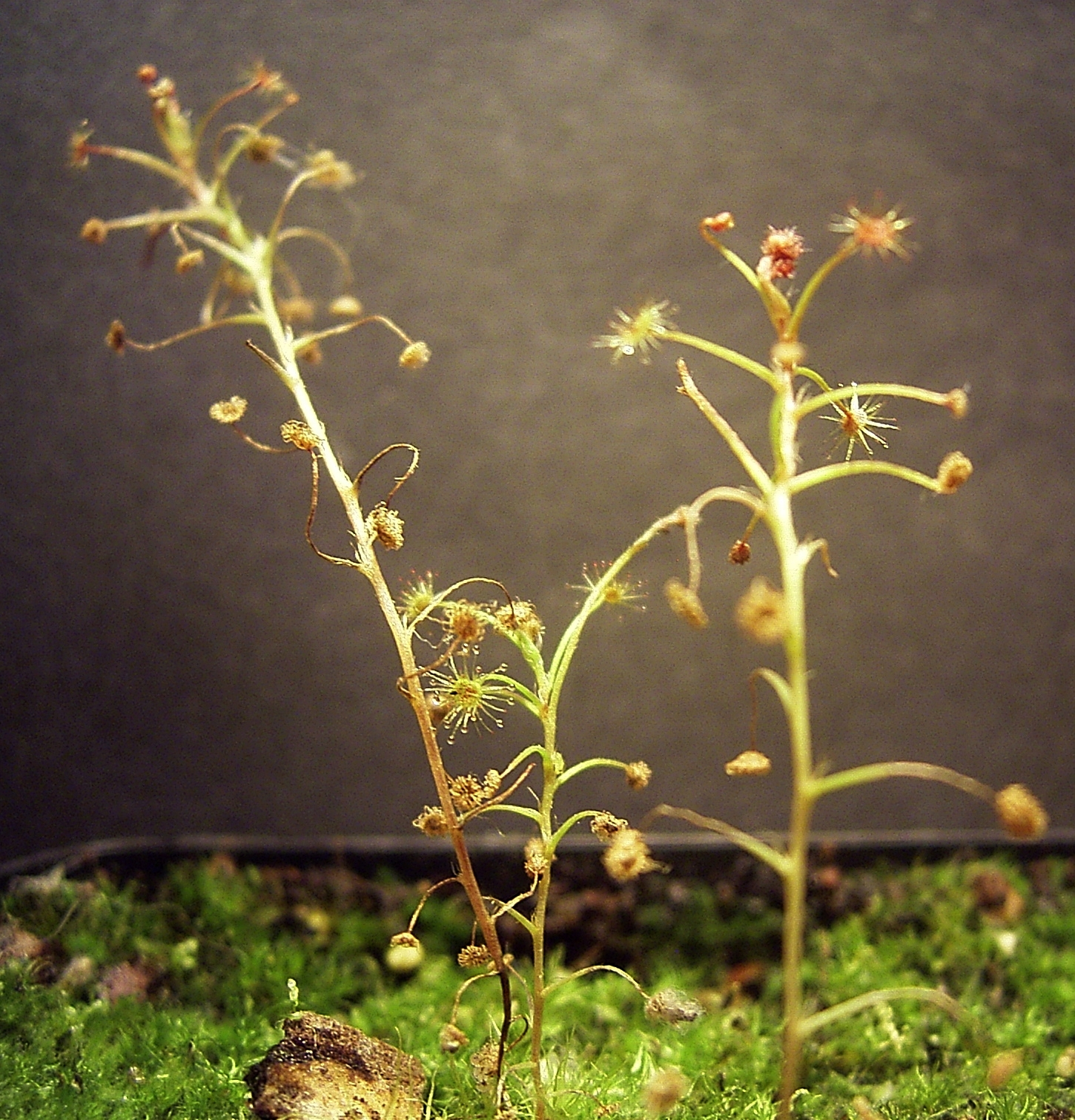

Scientific classification
- Kingdom: Plantae
- Clade: Tracheophytes
- Clade: Angiosperms
- Clade: Eudicots
- Order: Caryophyllales
- Family: Droseraceae
- Genus: Drosera
- Subgenus: Drosera subg. Lasiocephala
- Species: D. banksii

Binomial name
- Drosera banksii R.Br. ex DC.
- Drosera banksii distribution

= Drosera banksii =

Species of carnivorous plant

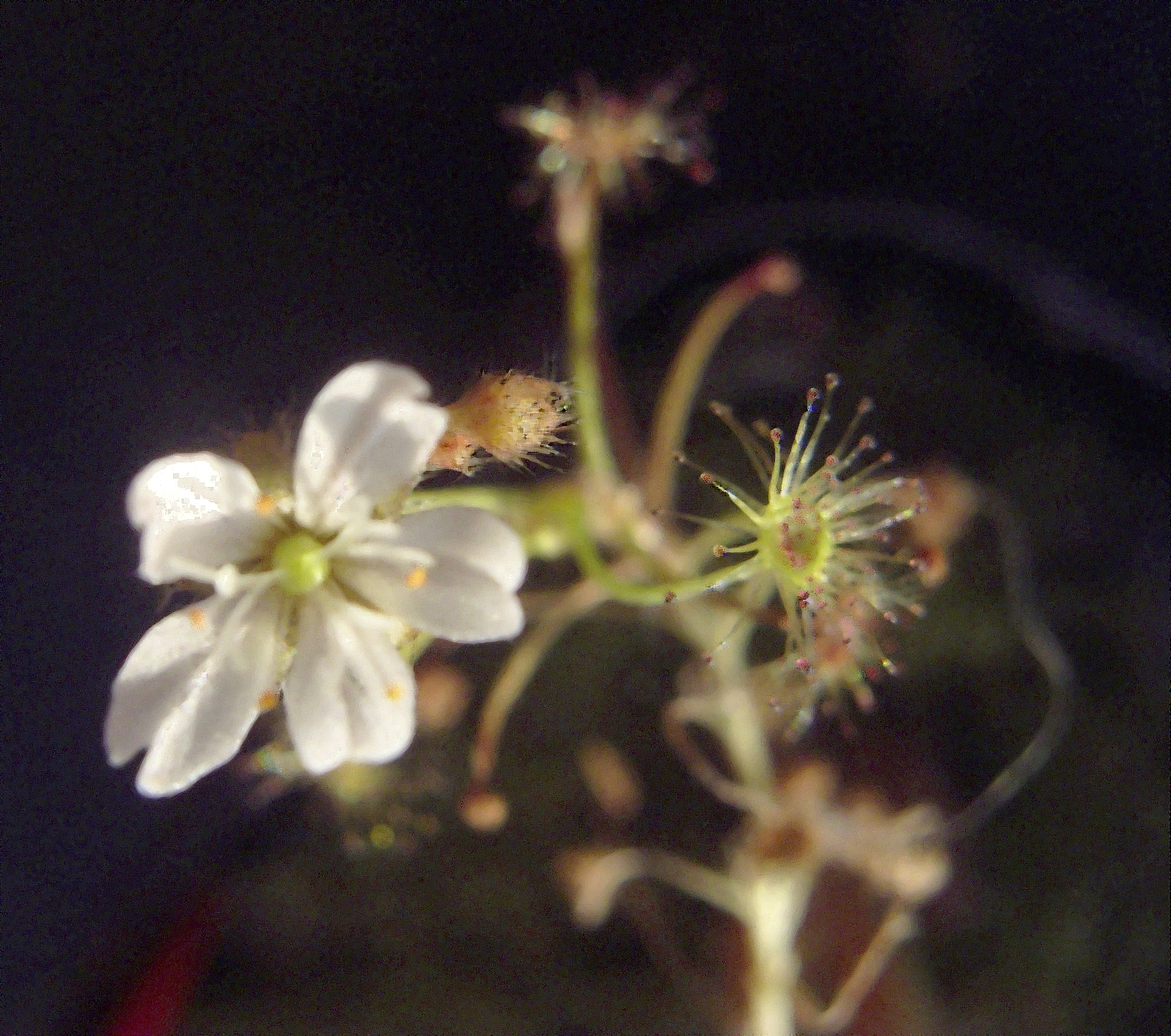
Flower

Drosera banksii, commonly known as Banks' sundew, is a small annual species in the carnivorous plant genus Drosera. The reniform-shaped leaves are attached to petioles and arranged in a circular pattern (rosette) around the stem. The 5 mm wide flowers are white. It is native to northern Australia (Queensland, the Northern Territory, and Western Australia) and Southeast Asia (Papua New Guinea and Western New Guinea). D. banksii was originally described by Robert Brown and validly published by Augustin Pyramus de Candolle in 1824.

== See also ==
- List of Drosera species
- Taxonomy of Drosera
