= Drosera caduca =

Scientific classification
- Kingdom: Plantae
- Clade: Tracheophytes
- Clade: Angiosperms
- Clade: Eudicots
- Order: Caryophyllales
- Family: Droseraceae
- Genus: Drosera
- Subgenus: Drosera subg. Lasiocephala
- Species: D. caduca

Binomial name
- Drosera caduca Lowrie

Species of carnivorous plant

Drosera caduca is a perennial carnivorous plant in the genus Drosera that is endemic to Western Australia. Its leaves are arranged in a rosette with one or more rosettes emerging from the root stock. It produces white flowers from December to July. Drosera caduca grows in white sandy soils on creek margins from the Edkins Range to the southern part of the Prince Regent National Park and also on Augustus Island. It was first described by Allen Lowrie in 1996; the type specimen was collected from August Island on 27 May 1993. The specific epithet caduca comes from the Latin caducus meaning dropping off early, in reference to the absence of the insect-trapping trichomes on all but the juvenile leaves. This plant is unique in the genus by its lack of the sticky traps on the mature adult leaves.

== See also ==
- List of Drosera species
- Taxonomy of Drosera
