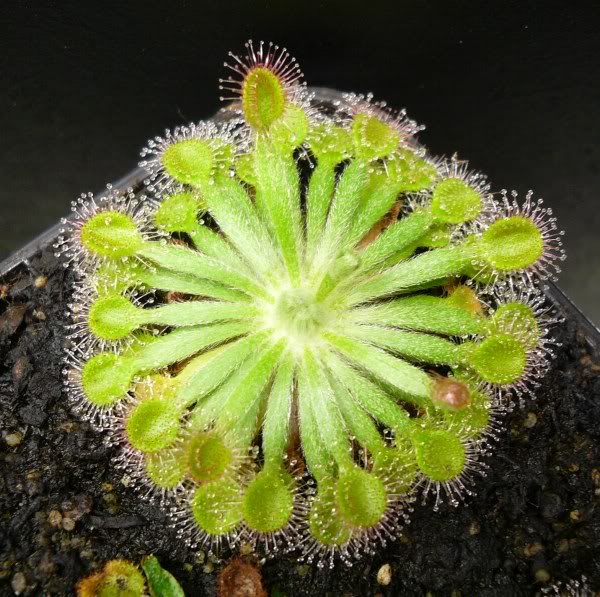

Scientific classification
- Kingdom: Plantae
- Clade: Tracheophytes
- Clade: Angiosperms
- Clade: Eudicots
- Order: Caryophyllales
- Family: Droseraceae
- Genus: Drosera
- Subgenus: Drosera subg. Lasiocephala
- Species: D. darwinensis

Binomial name
- Drosera darwinensis Lowrie

= Drosera darwinensis =

Species of carnivorous plant

Drosera darwinensis is a perennial carnivorous plant in the genus Drosera that is endemic to the Northern Territory. Its leaves are arranged in a rosette with one rosette emerging from the root stock. It produces pink or white flowers from December to April. Drosera darwinensis grows in clayey sand from Palmerston to Berry Springs south of Darwin and east to Humpty Doo. It was first described by Allen Lowrie in 1996; the type specimen was collected 0.9 km (0.6 mi) south of Temple Avenue in Palmerston on 8 April 1990. The specific epithet darwinensis refers to region where this plant is found in abundance. It is closely related to D. brevicornis, but differs from that species by its shorter inflorescence (5–15 cm long in D. darwinensis and 30–40 cm long in D. brevicornis).

== See also ==
- List of Drosera species
- Taxonomy of Drosera
