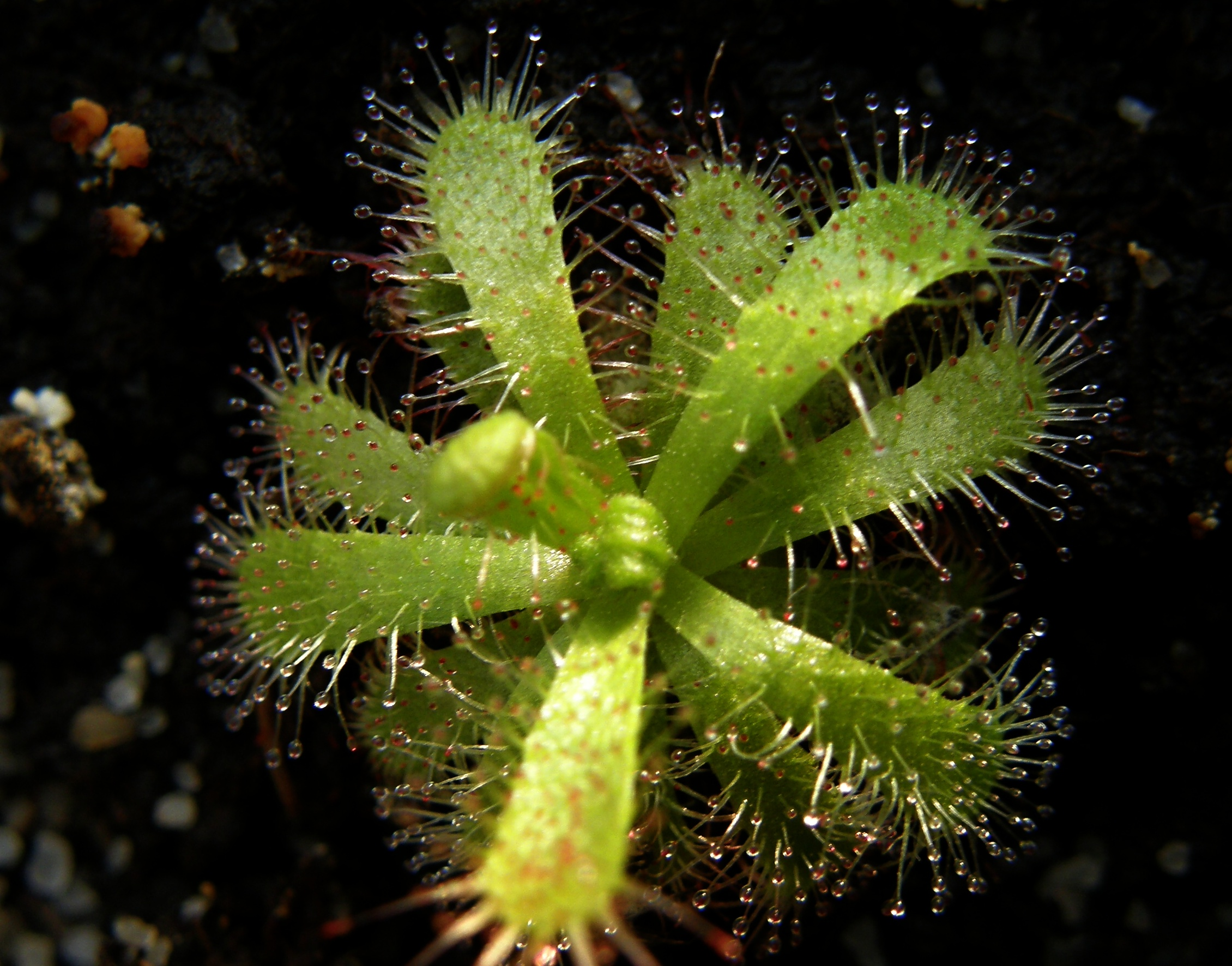

Scientific classification
- Kingdom: Plantae
- Clade: Embryophytes
- Clade: Tracheophytes
- Clade: Spermatophytes
- Clade: Angiosperms
- Clade: Eudicots
- Order: Caryophyllales
- Family: Droseraceae
- Genus: Drosera
- Subgenus: Drosera subg. Drosera
- Section: Drosera sect. Drosera
- Species: D. trinervia

Binomial name
- Drosera trinervia Spreng.

Synonyms
- Drosera afra Debbert; Drosera albiflora Banks ex Planch

= Drosera trinervia =

Species of carnivorous plant

Drosera trinervia is a species in the carnivorous plant genus Drosera that is endemic to the Cape Provinces of South Africa. It was first described by Kurt Polycarp Joachim Sprengel in his 1820 work Neue Entdeckungen im ganzen Umfang der Pflanzenkunde.

== See also ==
- List of Drosera species
- Taxonomy of Drosera
