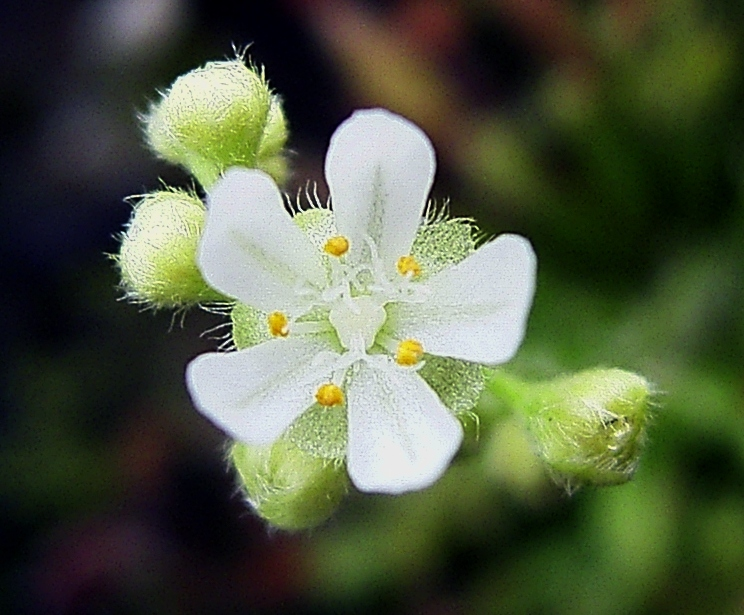

Scientific classification
- Kingdom: Plantae
- Clade: Tracheophytes
- Clade: Angiosperms
- Clade: Eudicots
- Order: Caryophyllales
- Family: Droseraceae
- Genus: Drosera
- Subgenus: Drosera subg. Lasiocephala
- Species: D. dilatatopetiolaris

Binomial name
- Drosera dilatatopetiolaris K.Kondo
- Distribution of D. dilatatopetiolaris in Australia

= Drosera dilatatopetiolaris =

Species of carnivorous plant

Drosera dilatatopetiolaris is a carnivorous plant in the genus Drosera and is endemic to Australia, being found in both Western Australia and the Northern Territory.

== Description ==
Its leaves are arranged in a rosette and commonly produces plantlets, eventually forming large clumps that can be over 1 ft (0.3 m) across. Green petioles emerging from the center of the rosette are typically 3–5 mm wide, but can vary. Red carnivorous leaves at the end of the petioles are small and round, with most resting on the soil surface. Inflorescences are 18 cm (7 in) long with white flowers being produced from April to May. It has a diploid chromosome number of 2n = 12.

== Distribution and habitat ==
Drosera dilatatopetiolaris is found in damp sandy soils on higher ground than Drosera petiolaris is found. It is native to coastal areas near Darwin in the Northern Territory and the northern Kimberley region of Western Australia.

== Botanical history ==
It was first recognised and illustrated by Ludwig Diels in his 1906 monograph on the Droseraceae, but was not formally described until 1984 when Katsuhiko Kondo authored three new species in the Drosera petiolaris complex. The original spelling of the specific epithet was given as dilatato-petiolaris but the hyphen is now deleted in accordance with Article 60.11 of the International Code of Nomenclature.

== See also ==
- List of Drosera species
- Taxonomy of Drosera
