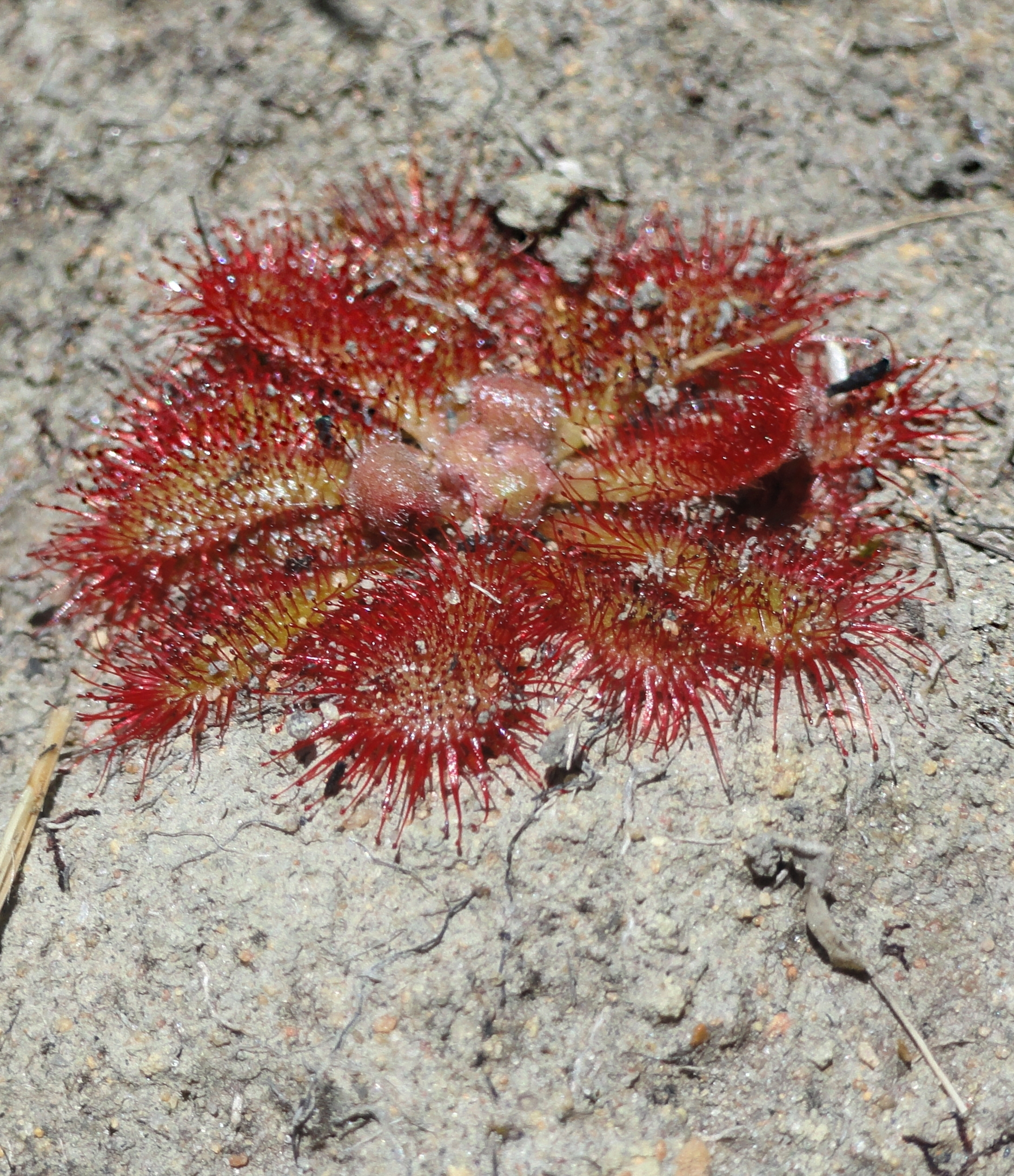

Scientific classification
- Kingdom: Plantae
- Clade: Tracheophytes
- Clade: Angiosperms
- Clade: Eudicots
- Order: Caryophyllales
- Family: Droseraceae
- Genus: Drosera
- Subgenus: Drosera subg. Drosera
- Section: Drosera sect. Drosera
- Species: D. tentaculata

Binomial name
- Drosera tentaculata Rivadavia

= Drosera tentaculata =

Species of carnivorous plant

Drosera tentaculata is a carnivorous plant native to Brazil. The species is endemic to the Brazil and occurs in "rupestre" field at the "Cadeia do Espinhaço" Highlands in the Bahia and Minas Gerais.

== See also ==
- List of Drosera species
- Taxonomy of Drosera
