= Taxonomy of Drosera =

The genus Drosera was divided in 1994 by Seine & Barthlott into three subgenera and 11 sections on the basis of morphological characteristics.

Discovery and description of new species has been occurring since the 10th century, and as recently as the 1940s barely more than 80 species were known. In recent years, Australian Allen Lowrie has done extensive work in the genus, particularly in describing numerous new species from Australia. His classification of the genus was replaced by Jan Schlauer's work in 1996, although the correct classification is still disputed.

== Drosera subg. Arcturia ==
- Drosera arcturi
- Drosera murfetii
- Drosera stenopetala

== Drosera subg. Bryastrum ==
=== D. sect. Bryastrum ===
- Drosera pygmaea

=== Drosera sect. Lamprolepis ===
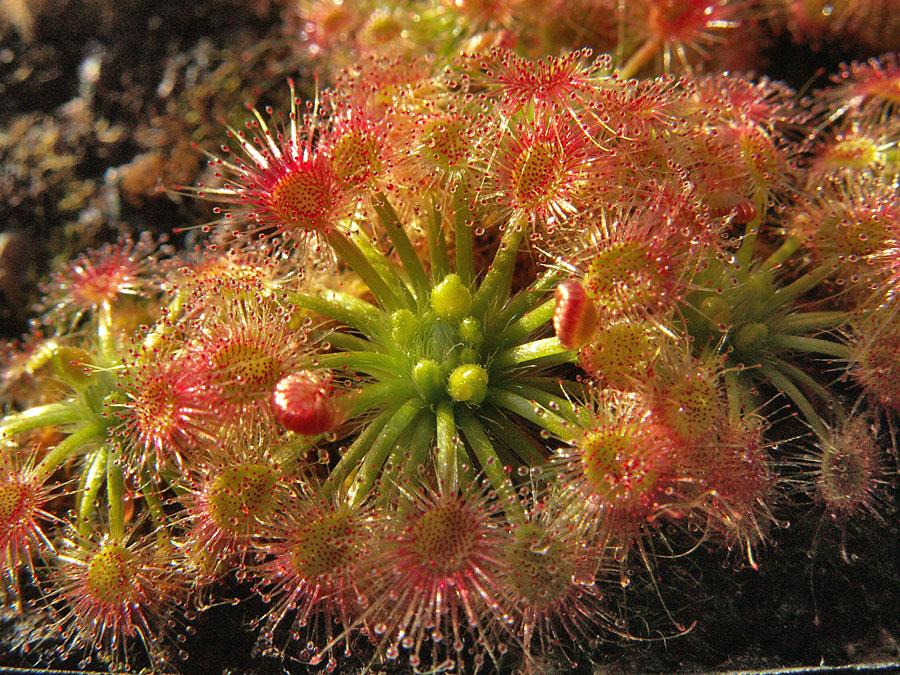
D. echinoblastus

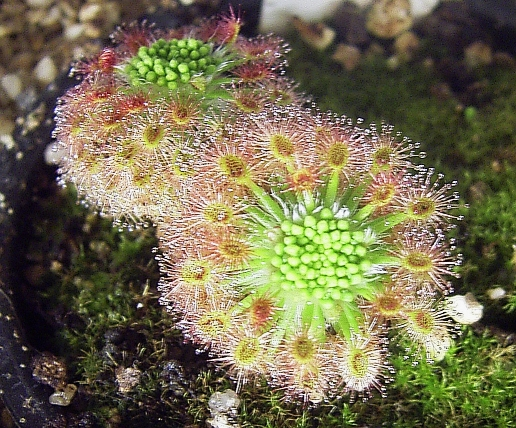
D. roseana

- Drosera allantostigma
- Drosera androsacea
- Drosera barbigera
- Drosera callistos
- Drosera citrina
- Drosera closterostigma
- Drosera dichrosepala
- Drosera echinoblastus
- Drosera eneabba
- Drosera enodes
- Drosera gibsonii
- Drosera grievei
- Drosera helodes
- Drosera hyperostigma
- Drosera lasiantha
- Drosera leucoblasta
- Drosera leucostigma
- Drosera mannii
- Drosera microscapa
- Drosera miniata
- Drosera nitidula
- Drosera nivea
- Drosera occidentalis
- Drosera omissa
- Drosera oreopodion
- Drosera paleacea
- Drosera parvula
- Drosera patens
- Drosera pedicellaris
- Drosera platystigma
- Drosera pulchella
- Drosera pycnoblasta
- Drosera rechingeri
- Drosera roseana
- Drosera sargentii
- Drosera scorpioides
- Drosera sewelliae
- Drosera silvicola
- Drosera spilos
- Drosera stelliflora
- Drosera walyunga

== Drosera subg. Coelophylla ==
- Drosera glanduligera

== Drosera subg. Drosera ==
=== Drosera sect. Arachnopus ===
- Drosera hartmeyerorum
- Drosera serpens
- Drosera fragrans
- Drosera aurantiaca
- Drosera aquatica
- Drosera barrettorum
- Drosera nana
- Drosera glabriscapa
- Drosera margaritacea
- Drosera indica
- Drosera finlaysoniana

=== Drosera sect. Drosera ===
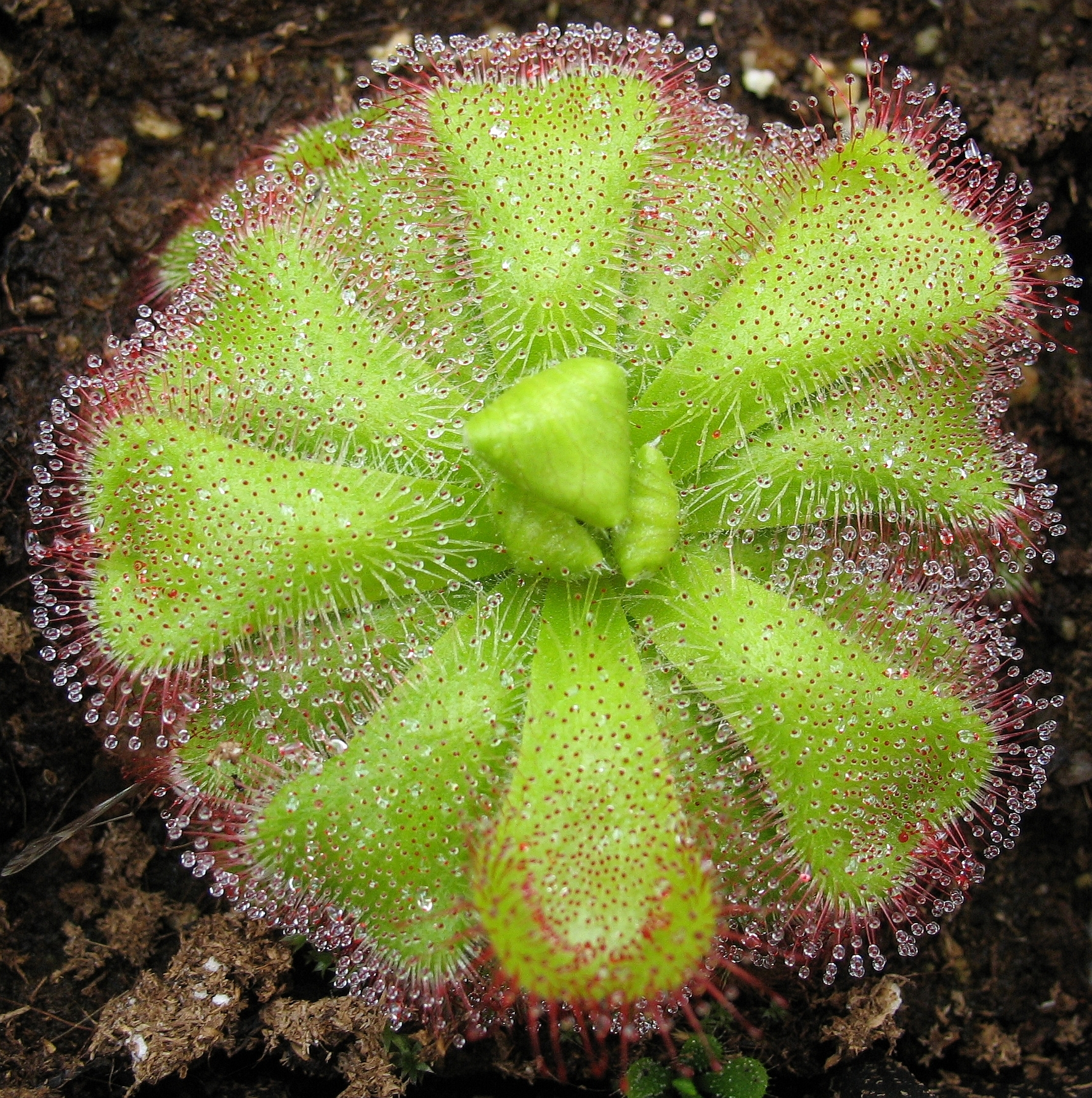
D. cuneifolia

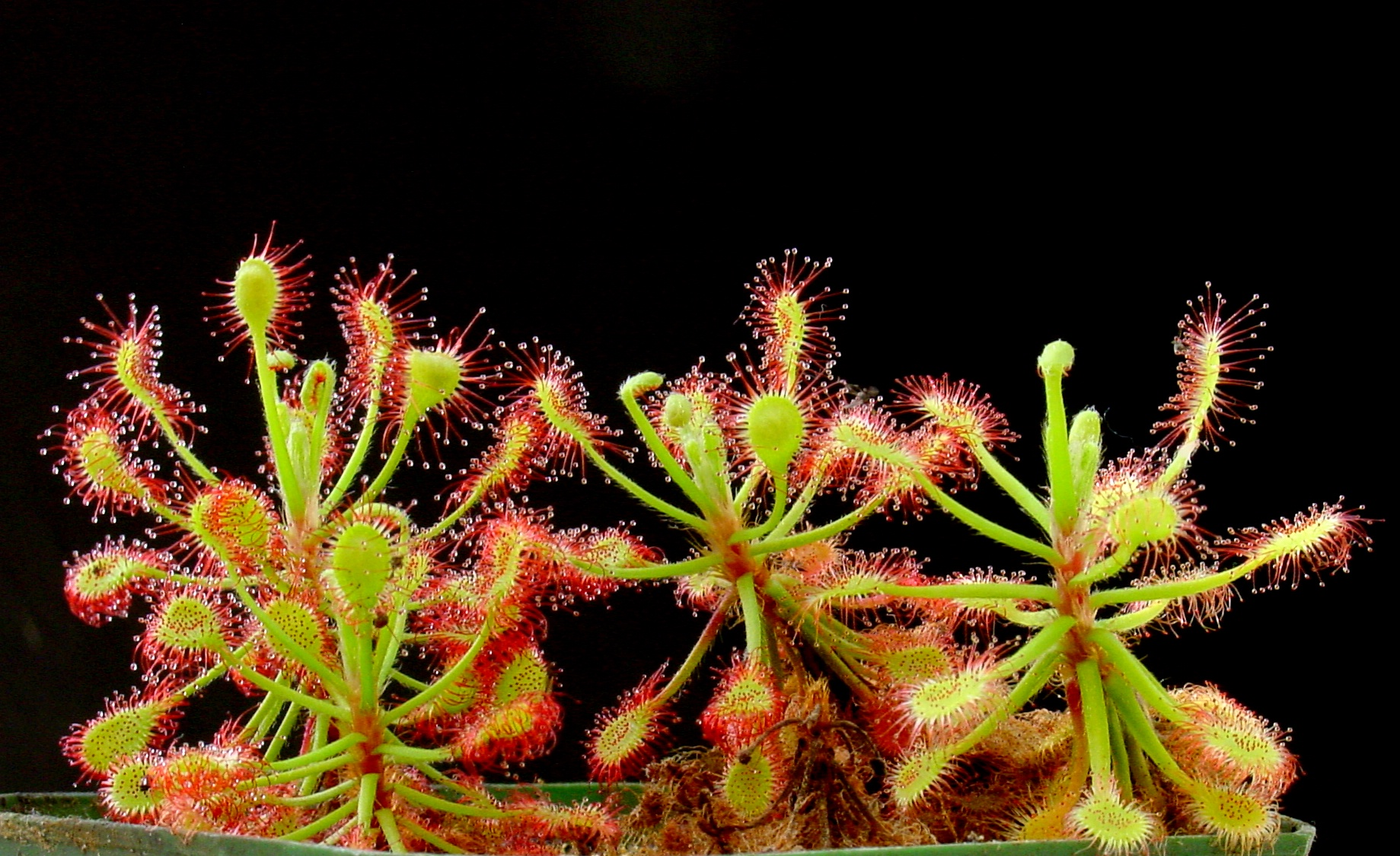
D. madagascariensis

- Drosera acaulis
- Drosera admirabilis
- Drosera affinis
- Drosera afra
- Drosera alba
- Drosera aliciae
- Drosera amazonica
- Drosera anglica
- Drosera arenicola
- Drosera ascendens
- Drosera bequaertii
- Drosera biflora
- Drosera brevifolia
- Drosera burkeana
- Drosera camporupestris
- Drosera capensis
- Drosera capillaris
- Drosera cayennensis
- Drosera cendeensis
- Drosera chrysolepis
- Drosera cistiflora
- Drosera collinsiae
- Drosera communis
- Drosera cuneifolia
- Drosera dielsiana
- Drosera elongata
- Drosera ericgreenii
- Drosera esmeraldae
- Drosera esterhuyseniae
- Drosera felix
- Drosera filiformis
- Drosera glabripes
- Drosera graminifolia
- Drosera grantsaui
- Drosera graomogolensis
- Drosera hilaris
- Drosera hirtella
- Drosera hirticalyx
- Drosera humbertii
- Drosera intermedia
- Drosera kaieteurensis
- Drosera katangensis
- Drosera latifolia
- Drosera linearis
- Drosera longiscapa
- Drosera madagascariensis
- Drosera montana
- Drosera natalensis
- Drosera neocaledonica
- Drosera nidiformis
- Drosera oblanceolata
- Drosera pauciflora
- Drosera peruensis
- Drosera pilosa
- Drosera quartzicola
- Drosera ramentacea
- Drosera roraimae
- Drosera rotundifolia
- Drosera rubrifolia
- Drosera schwackei
- Drosera slackii
- Drosera solaris
- Drosera spatulata
- Drosera spiralis
- Drosera tentaculata
- Drosera tokaiensis
- Drosera tomentosa
- Drosera trinervia
- Drosera uniflora
- Drosera venusta
- Drosera villosa
- Drosera viridis
- Drosera yutajensis
- Drosera zeyheri

=== Drosera sect. Prolifera ===
- Drosera adelae
- Drosera prolifera
- Drosera schizandra
- Drosera buubugujin

== Drosera subg. Ergaleium ==
=== Drosera sect. Ergaleium ===
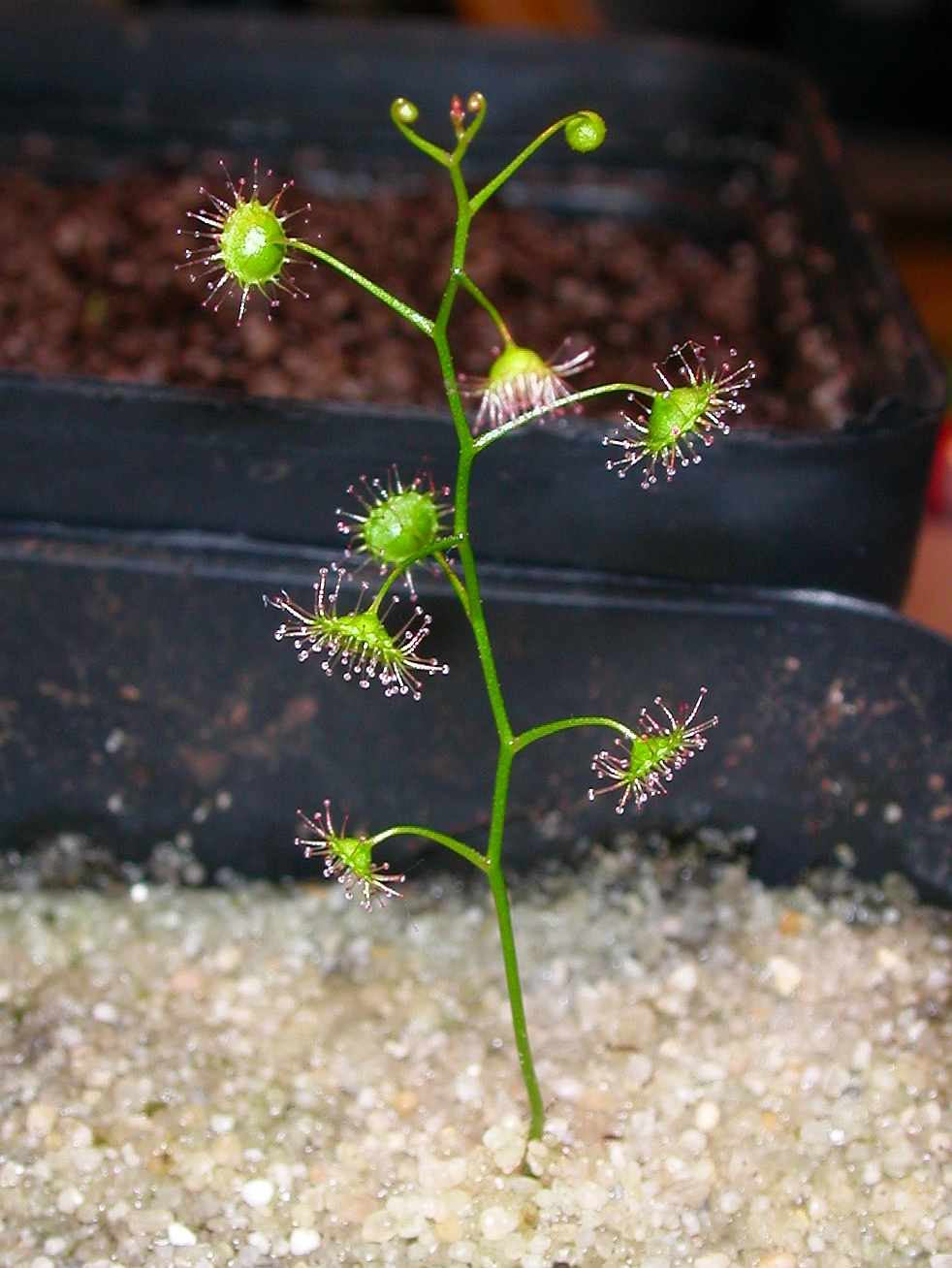
D. menziesii

- Drosera andersoniana
- Drosera bicolor
- Drosera bulbigena
- Drosera erythrogyne
- Drosera gigantea
- Drosera graniticola
- Drosera heterophylla
- Drosera huegelii
- Drosera intricata
- Drosera macrantha
- Drosera marchantii
- Drosera menziesii
- Drosera microphylla
- Drosera modesta
- Drosera moorei
- Drosera myriantha
- Drosera neesii
- Drosera pallida
- Drosera peltata
- Drosera radicans
- Drosera salina
- Drosera stricticaulis
- Drosera subhirtella
- Drosera subtilis
- Drosera sulphurea
- Drosera zigzagia

=== Drosera sect. Erythrorhiza ===
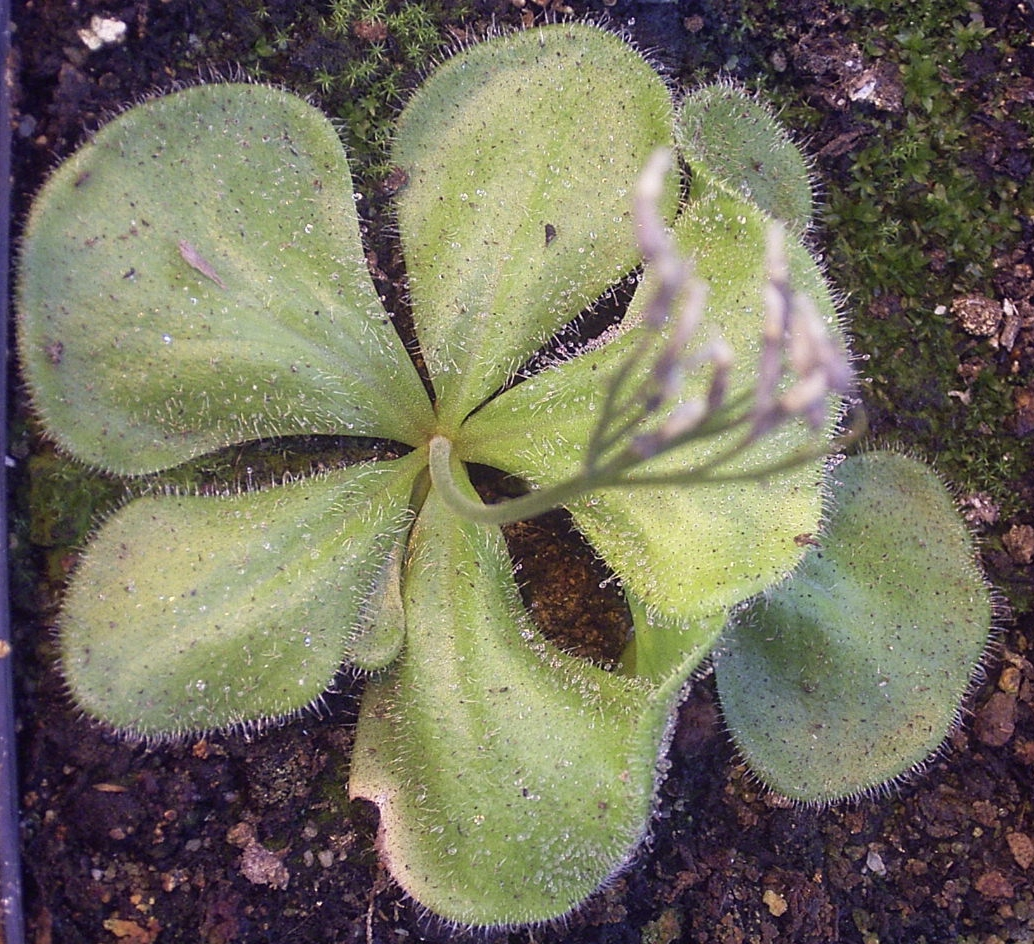
D. erythrorhiza

- Drosera aberrans
- Drosera browniana
- Drosera bulbosa
- Drosera erythrorhiza
- Drosera lowriei
- Drosera macrophylla
- Drosera orbiculata
- Drosera praefolia
- Drosera prostratoscaposa
- Drosera rosulata
- Drosera schmutzii
- Drosera tubaestylis
- Drosera whittakeri
- Drosera zonaria

=== Drosera sect. Stolonifera ===
- Drosera fimbriata
- Drosera humilis
- Drosera monticola
- Drosera platypoda
- Drosera porrecta
- Drosera prostrata
- Drosera purpurascens
- Drosera ramellosa
- Drosera rupicola
- Drosera stolonifera

== Drosera subg. Lasiocephala ==
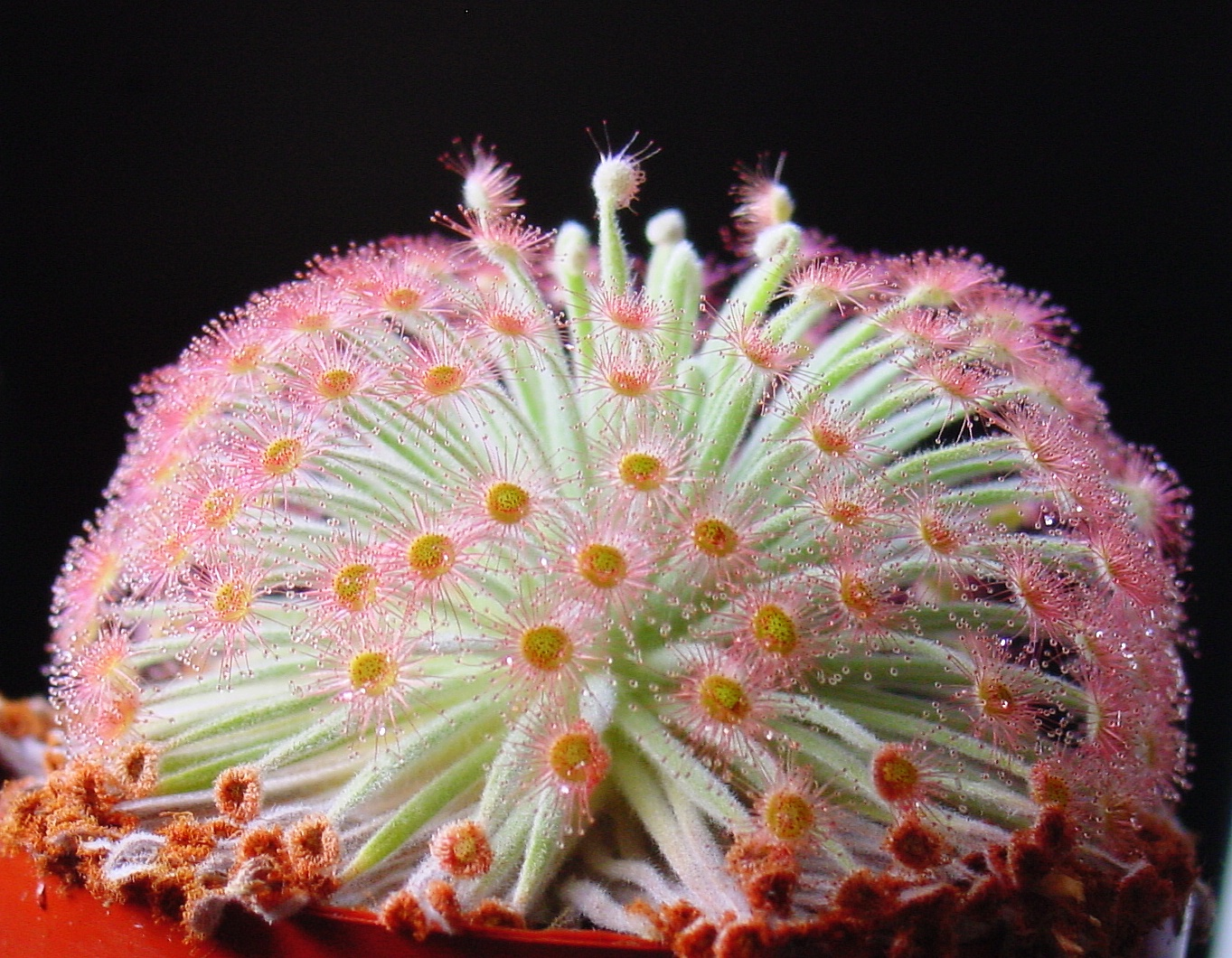
D. derbyensis

- Drosera banksii
- Drosera brevicornis
- Drosera broomensis
- Drosera caduca
- Drosera darwinensis
- Drosera derbyensis
- Drosera dilatato-petiolaris
- Drosera falconeri
- Drosera fulva
- Drosera kenneallyi
- Drosera lanata
- Drosera ordensis
- Drosera paradoxa
- Drosera petiolaris
- Drosera subtilis

== Drosera subg. Meristocaulis ==
- Drosera meristocaulis

== Drosera subg. Phycopsis ==
- Drosera binata

== Drosera subg. Regiae ==
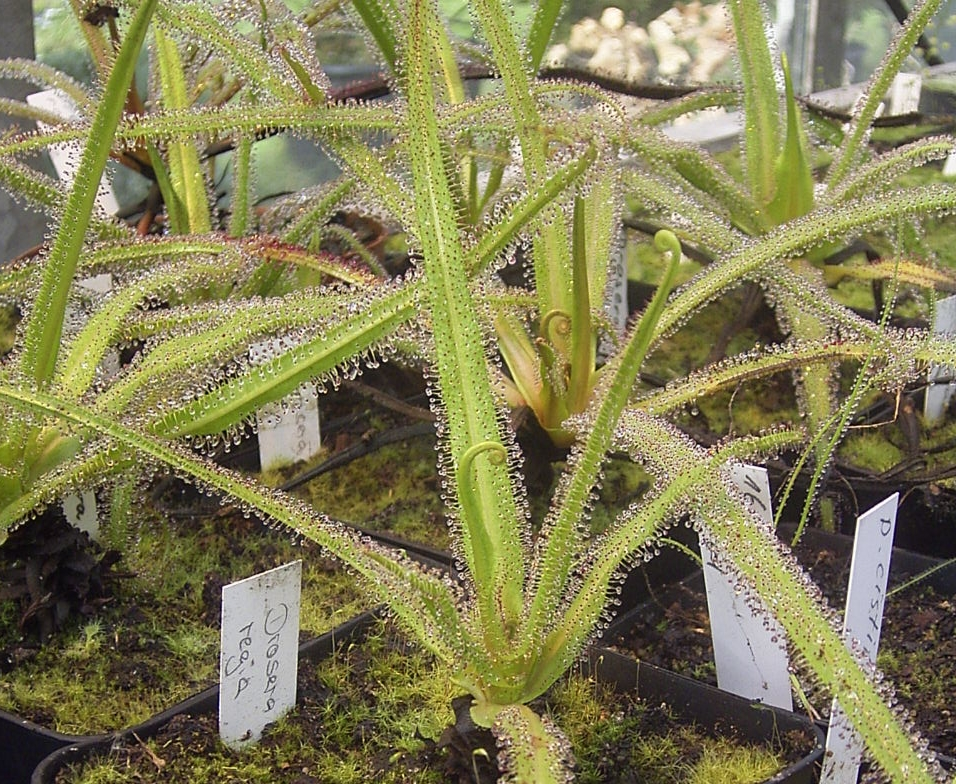
D. regia

- Drosera regia

== Drosera subg. Stelogyne ==
- Drosera hamiltonii

== Drosera subg. Thelocalyx ==
- Drosera burmannii
- Drosera sessilifolia

== Incertae sedis ==
- Drosera magnifica
