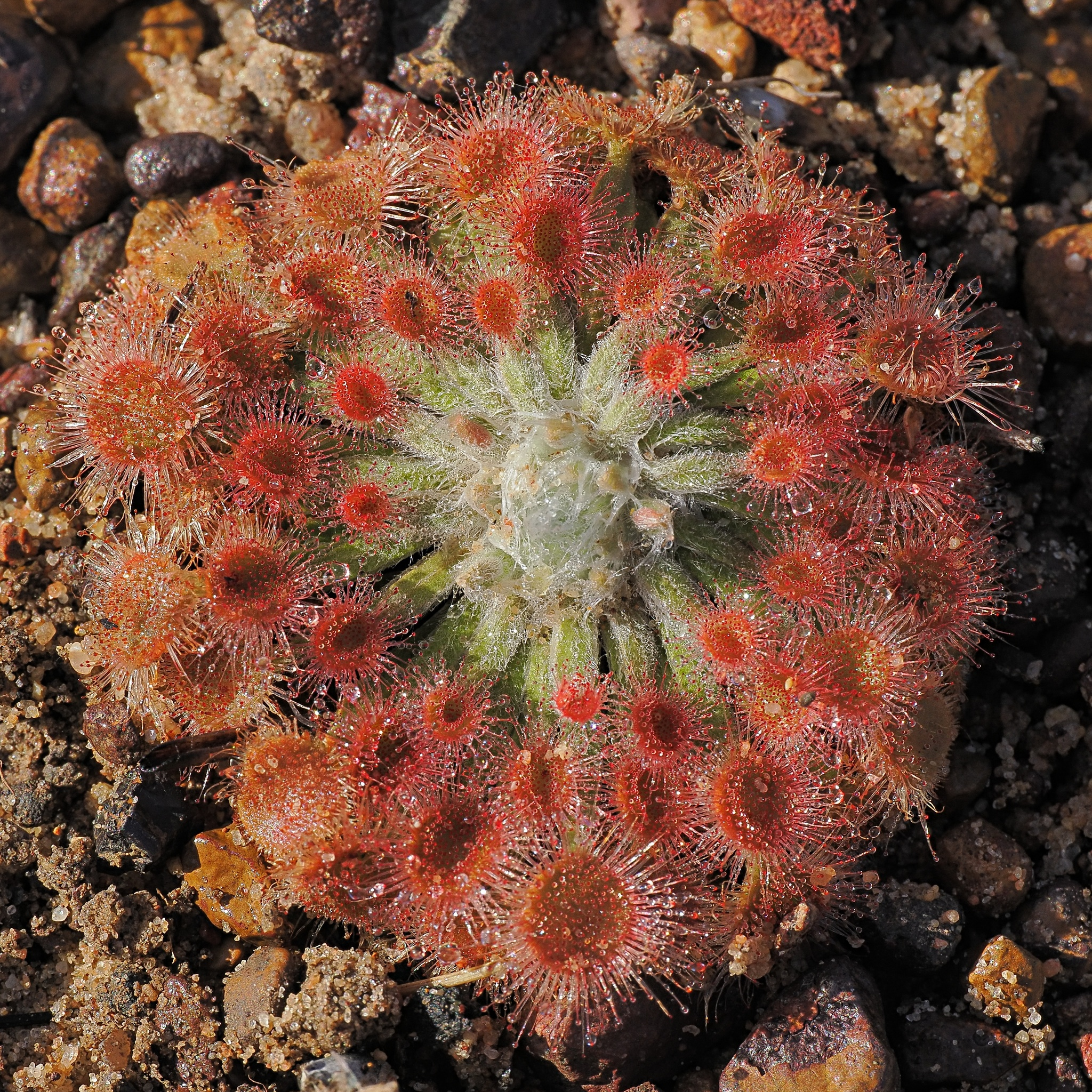

Scientific classification
- Kingdom: Plantae
- Clade: Tracheophytes
- Clade: Angiosperms
- Clade: Eudicots
- Order: Caryophyllales
- Family: Droseraceae
- Genus: Drosera
- Subgenus: Drosera subg. Lasiocephala
- Species: D. brevicornis

Binomial name
- Drosera brevicornis Lowrie
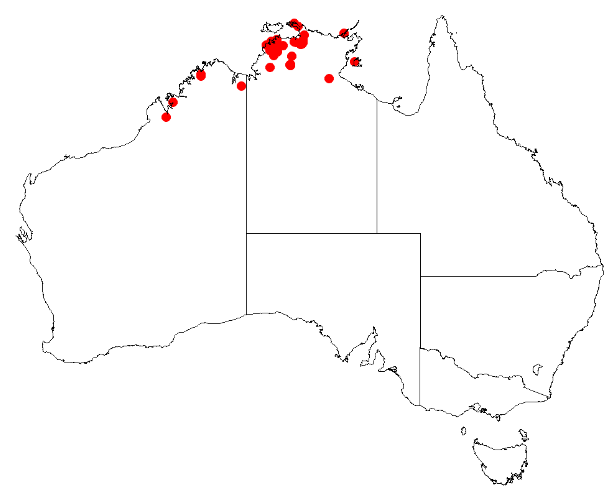
- Occurrence data from AVH

= Drosera brevicornis =

Species of carnivorous plant

Drosera brevicornis is a small, perennial carnivorous plant in the genus Drosera that is native to the Northern Territory and Western Australia. It grows on gravel slopes and produces white to pink flowers in March and April. It was first described by Allen Lowrie in 1996, though earlier specimens from as early as 1961 had been collected. The specific epithet brevicornis means "short horned" and refers to the horn-like projection above the anthers. It is closely related to Drosera fulva.

== See also ==
- List of Drosera species
- Taxonomy of Drosera
