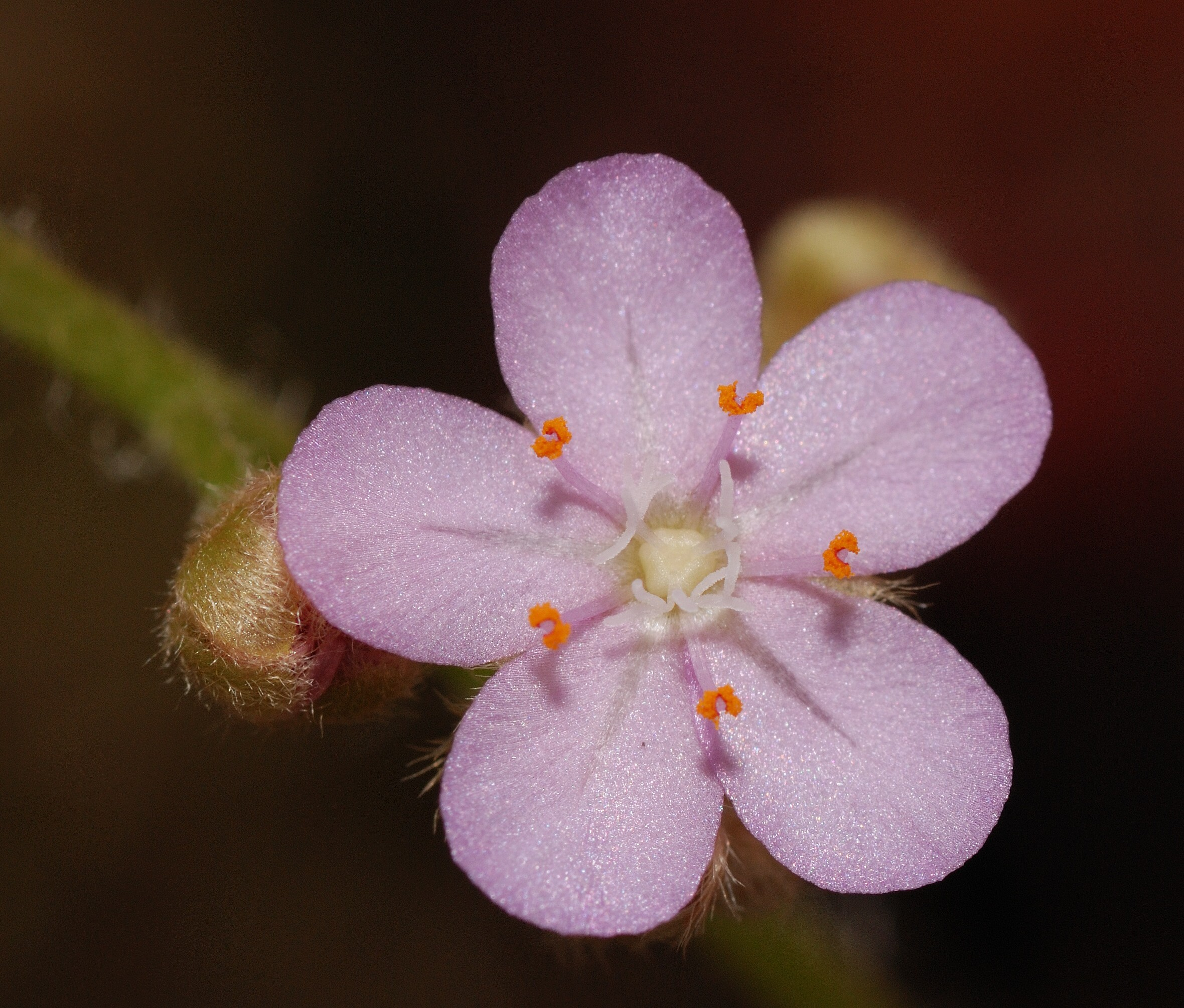

Scientific classification
- Kingdom: Plantae
- Clade: Tracheophytes
- Clade: Angiosperms
- Clade: Eudicots
- Order: Caryophyllales
- Family: Droseraceae
- Genus: Drosera
- Subgenus: Drosera subg. Lasiocephala
- Species: D. petiolaris

Binomial name
- Drosera petiolaris R.Br. ex DC.
- Distribution of D. petiolaris in Australia

= Drosera petiolaris =

Species of carnivorous plant

Drosera petiolaris is a carnivorous plant in the genus Drosera and is the eponymous species of the petiolaris species complex, which mostly refers to the entire subgenus Lasiocephala. It is native to Northern Australia, including the northern regions of Western Australia, the Northern Territory, and Queensland, and New Guinea; this distribution is the largest in the subgenus and the only that extends beyond Australia. Its leaves are arranged in a compact basal rosette with long, narrow petioles emerging from the center of the rosette. Carnivorous leaves are held at the end of the petiole with long retentive glands.

== Botanical history ==
Drosera petiolaris was first formally described by the Swiss botanist Augustin Pyramus de Candolle in the first volume of Prodromus Systematis Naturalis Regni Vegetabilis in 1824. In this description, de Candolle cited an unpublished description by Scottish botanist Robert Brown as a basis for his valid description of the species. The type specimen was collected at the Endeavour River in Queensland by Joseph Banks and Daniel Solander on the first voyage of James Cook aboard HMS Endeavour.

== See also ==
- List of Drosera species
- Taxonomy of Drosera
