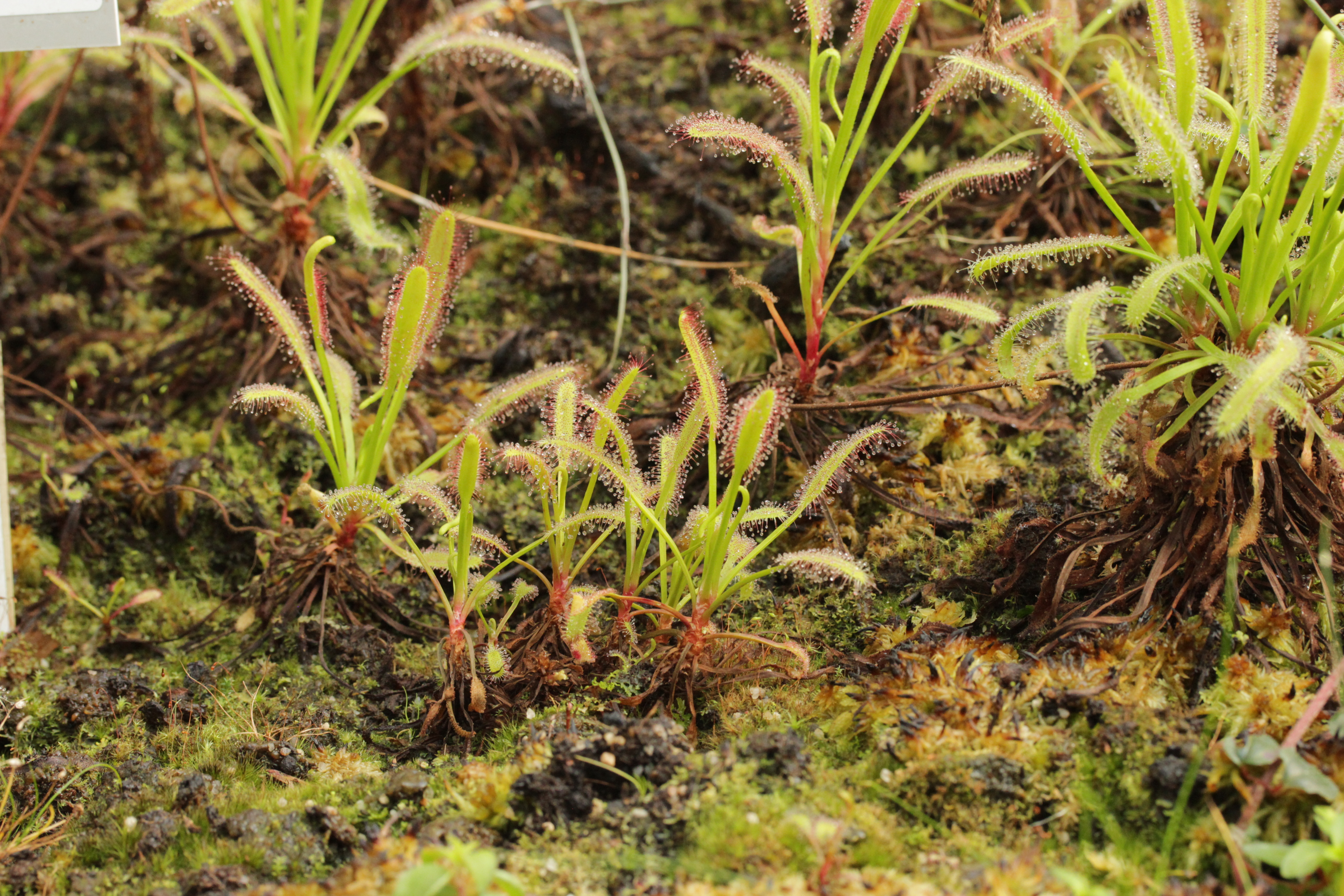
- Drosera capensis

Scientific classification
- Kingdom: Plantae
- Clade: Tracheophytes
- Clade: Angiosperms
- Clade: Eudicots
- Order: Caryophyllales
- Family: Droseraceae
- Genus: Drosera
- Subgenus: Drosera subg. Drosera
- Section: Drosera sect. Drosera

Species
- See text

= Drosera sect. Drosera =

Section of carnivorous plants

Drosera sect. Drosera is a section within the subgenus Drosera in the genus Drosera (sundews).

== Description and distribution ==
Image	Scientific name	Distribution
	Drosera acaulis L.f.	South Africa (Cape Province)
	Drosera admirabilis Debbert	South Africa
	Drosera affinis Welw. ex Oliv.	South Africa
	Drosera afra E.Phillips	Cape Provinces of South Africa
	Drosera aliciae Raym.-Hamet	Cape Provinces of South Africa
	Drosera amazonica Rivadavia, A.Fleischm. & Vicent.	Amazonas and Roraima State, Brazil
	Drosera anglica Huds.	Circumboreal (Eurasia and North America), extending as far south as Japan, southern Europe, and Kauai
	Drosera arachnoides Rakotoar. & A.Fleischm.	Madagascar
	Drosera arenicola Steyerm.	Venezuela and Brazil
	Drosera ascendens A.St.-Hil.	Brazil (Minas Gerais)
	Drosera atrostyla Debbert	Cape Provinces of South Africa
	Drosera bequaertii Taton	Congo and Angola
	Drosera biflora Willd. ex Schult.	Venezuela to Brazil,
	Drosera brevifolia Pursh	east Texas to Florida and north to Virginia
	Drosera burkeana Planch.	Congo and Uganda to South Africa, Madagascar.
	Drosera camporupestris Rivadavia	Brazil (Minas Gerais)
	Drosera capensis L.	Cape in South Africa.
	Drosera capillaris Poir.	southern United States, the Greater Antilles, wastern and southern Mexico, Central America, and northern South America
	Drosera cayennensis Sagot ex Diels	Costa Rica to S. Tropical America.
	Drosera cendeensis Tamayo & Croizat	Venezuela
	Drosera chrysolepis Taub.	Brazil (Bahia to Minas Gerais)
	Drosera cistiflora L.	Cape Provinces of South Africa
	Drosera collinsiae N.E.Br.	South Africa.
	Drosera communis A.St.-Hil.	Brazil
	Drosera cuneifolia L.f.	Cape in South Africa
	Drosera curvipes Planch.	Northern Provinces, Swaziland
	Drosera dielsiana Exell & J.R.Laundon	South Africa (KwaZulu-Natal, the Free State, the Northern Provinces), Eswatini (Swaziland), Mozambique, Malawi, and Zimbabwe.
	Drosera elongata Exell & J.R.Laundon	Zambia
	Drosera ericgreenii A.Fleischm., R.P.Gibson & Rivadavia	Western Cape of South Africa
	Drosera esmeraldae (Steyerm.) Maguire & Wurdack	Venezuela
	Drosera esterhuyseniae (T.M.Salter) Debbert	Western Cape of South Africa
	Drosera felix Steyerm. & L.B.Sm.	Venezuela
	Drosera filiformis Raf.	Canada and the United States
	Drosera glabripes (Harv. ex Planch.) Stein	Cape in South Africa
	Drosera graminifolia A.St.-Hil.	Minas Gerais in Brazil
	Drosera grantsaui Rivadavia	Brazil to Paraguay
	Drosera graomogolensis T.R.S.Silva	Minas Gerais in Brazil
	Drosera hamiltonii C.R.P.Andrews	Western Australia.
	Drosera hirtella A.St.-Hil.	Brazil
	Drosera hilaris Cham. & Schltdl.	South Africa
	Drosera hirticalyx Duno de Stefano & Culham	Venezuela
	Drosera humbertii Exell & J.R.Laundon	Madagascar
	Drosera insolita Taton	Democratic Republic of the Congo
	Drosera intermedia Hayne	Europe, southeastern Canada, the eastern half of the United States, Cuba, Hispaniola, and northern South America
	Drosera kaieteurensis Brumm.-Ding.	Guyana
	Drosera katangensis Taton	Democratic Republic of Congo.
	Drosera linearis Goldie	Canada and the United States
	Drosera madagascariensis DC.	Africa (Guinea, Nigeria, Cameroon, Congo, Angola, Zambesi, Tanganyika) as far south as South Africa and east to the island of Madagascar.
	Drosera montana A.St.-Hil.	Brazil
	Drosera natalensis Diels	South Africa
	Drosera neocaledonica Raym.-Hamet	New Caledonia
	Drosera nidiformis Debbert	KwaZulu-Natal in South Africa
	Drosera oblanceolata Y.Z.Ruan	southern China
	Drosera pauciflora Banks ex DC.	Cape Provinces of South Africa.
	Drosera peruensis T.R.S.Silva & M.D.Correa	Peru
	Drosera pilosa Exell & J.R.Laundon	Zambia
	Drosera quartzicola Rivadavia & Gonella	Brazil (Minas Gerais)
	Drosera ramentacea Burch. ex DC.	Western Cape of South Africa.
	Drosera roraimae (Klotzsch ex Diels) Maguire & J.R.Laundon	northern North America, Korea and Japan
	Drosera rotundifolia L.	Europe and northern North America.
	Drosera rubrifolia Debbert	Cape Provinces of South Africa.
	Drosera schwackei (Diels) Rivadavia	Brazil (Minas Gerais)
	Drosera slackii Cheek	Cape Provinces of South Africa.
	Drosera solaris A.Fleischm., Wistuba & S.McPherson	Guyana.
	Drosera spatulata Labill.	Southeast Asia, southern China and Japan, Micronesia, Papua New Guinea, eastern Australia, Tasmania and New Zealand.
	Drosera spiralis A.St.-Hil.	Brazil (Minas Gerais)
	Drosera tentaculata (Komiya & Shibata) T.Nakamura & Ueda	Japan.
	Drosera tokaiensis Rivadavia	Brazil
	Drosera tomentosa A.St.-Hil.	Brazil
	Drosera trinervia Spreng.	Cape Provinces of South Africa
	Drosera ultramafica A.Fleischm., A.S.Rob. & S.McPherson	Malesia.
	Drosera uniflora Willd.	Chile
	Drosera venusta P.Debbert	Cape Provinces of South Africa
	Drosera villosa A.St.-Hil.	Brazil (E. Minas Gerais)
	Drosera viridis Rivadavia	Brazil ( Paraná and São Paulo and central Santa Catarina)
	Drosera yutajensis Duno de Stefano & Culham	Venezuela
	Drosera zeyheri T.M.Salter	Cape Provinces of South Africa

== See also ==
- List of Drosera species
