= Drosera yutajensis =

Scientific classification
- Kingdom: Plantae
- Clade: Tracheophytes
- Clade: Angiosperms
- Clade: Eudicots
- Order: Caryophyllales
- Family: Droseraceae
- Genus: Drosera
- Subgenus: Drosera subg. Drosera
- Section: Drosera sect. Drosera
- Species: D. yutajensis

Binomial name
- Drosera yutajensis R.Duno & Culham

Species of carnivorous plant

Drosera yutajensis is a rare species in the carnivorous plant genus Drosera. It is endemic to Venezuela in the Valley of Rio Coro-Coro and grows in moist, sandstone outcrops near sources of water at elevations from 600–1,800 metres (1,970–5,910 ft). This species was first collected in 1987 but was not formally described until Rodrigo Duno de Stefano and Alastair Culham published it in a 1995 volume of Novon. Drosera yutajensis is closely related to D. villosa and D. arenicola.

== See also ==
- List of Drosera species
- Taxonomy of Drosera
