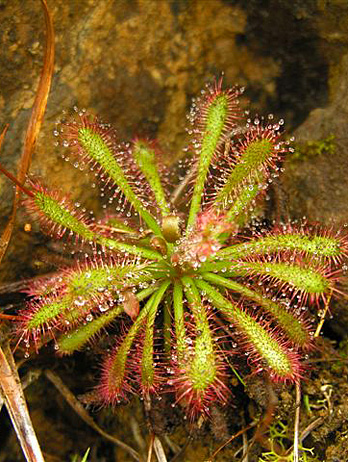
- A rosette of D. ultramafica growing on Mount Victoria, Palawan

Scientific classification
- Kingdom: Plantae
- Clade: Tracheophytes
- Clade: Angiosperms
- Clade: Eudicots
- Order: Caryophyllales
- Family: Droseraceae
- Genus: Drosera
- Species: D. ultramafica

Binomial name
- Drosera ultramafica A.Fleischm., A.S.Rob. & S.McPherson (2011)

= Drosera ultramafica =

Species of carnivorous plant

Drosera ultramafica is a species of sundew native to the highlands of Malesia. It is thought to be most closely related to Drosera spatulata, Drosera neocaledonica and Drosera oblanceolata. The taxon is readily distinguished from the former by its general habit and preference for mafic, upland habitats, and from the latter species by specific morphological differences, in addition to the fact that their geographical ranges do not overlap.
