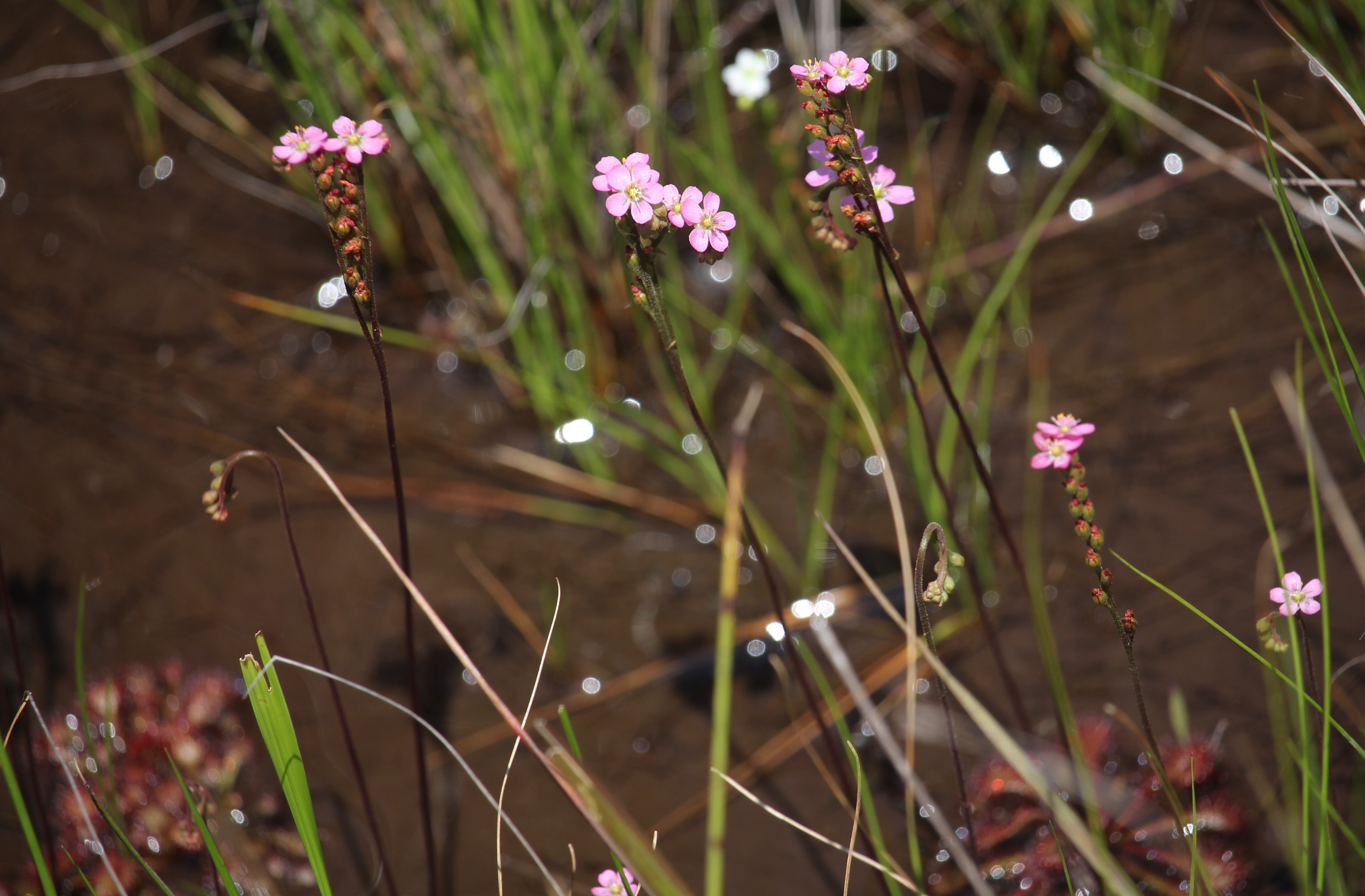

Scientific classification
- Kingdom: Plantae
- Clade: Tracheophytes
- Clade: Angiosperms
- Clade: Eudicots
- Order: Caryophyllales
- Family: Droseraceae
- Genus: Drosera
- Subgenus: Drosera subg. Drosera
- Section: Drosera sect. Drosera
- Species: D. tokaiensis

Binomial name
- Drosera tokaiensis (Komiya & Shibata) T.Nakamura & Ueda (1991)

Synonyms
- Drosera spatulata subsp. tokaiensis Komiya & Shibata (1978); Drosera spatulata var. rotundata Makino ex Ueda (1989); Drosera kansaiensis Debbert (1996)

= Drosera tokaiensis =

Species of carnivorous plant

Drosera tokaiensis is a species of sundew native to Japan. It is considered to be a natural hybrid of Drosera rotundifolia and Drosera spatulata. Leaf morphology is similar to the parental species, so its unidentifiable by that alone. So other methods are necessary. One method is to look at differences in their Biseriate Glandular Trichomes (BGTs). These two parent species have 20 and 40 chromosomes, respectively, so recent hybrids between them are sterile, having 30 chromosomes, while the stabilized, fertile D. tokaiensis has 60 (i.e. allohexaploid). The species was previously thought to be a subspecies or variety of Drosera spatulata. It is often mistaken for D. spatulata in cultivation.

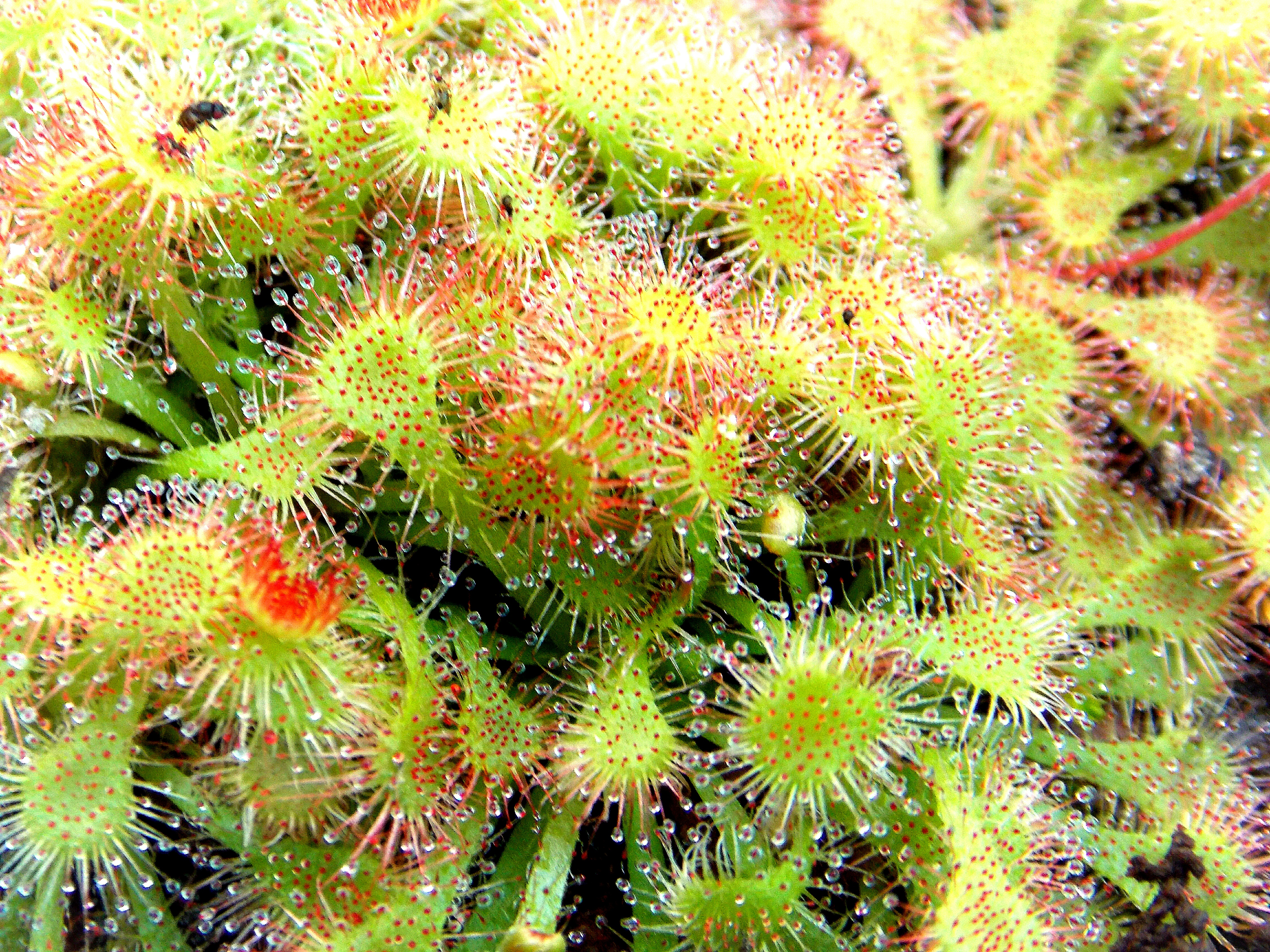
Drosera tokaiensis in cultivation

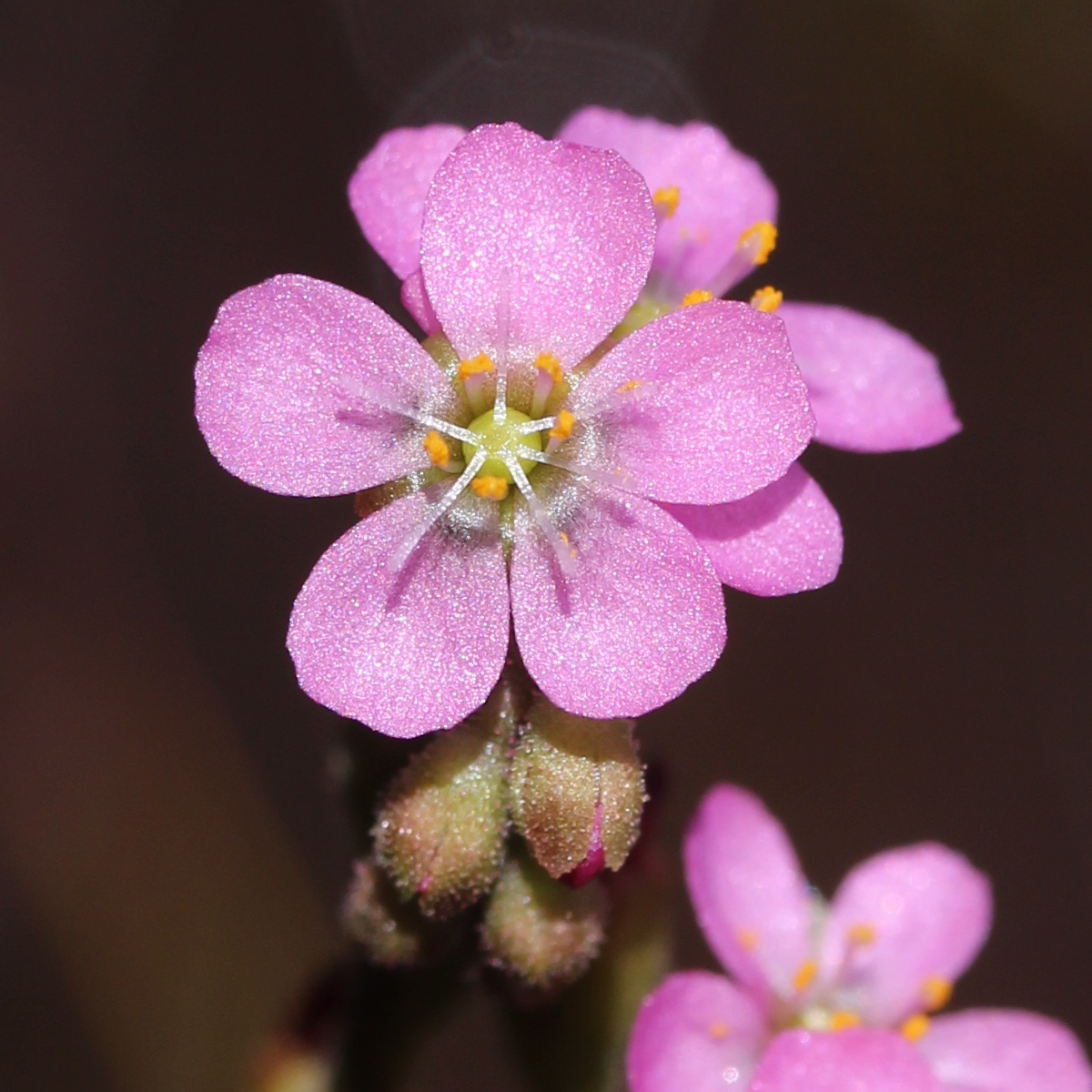
Flower

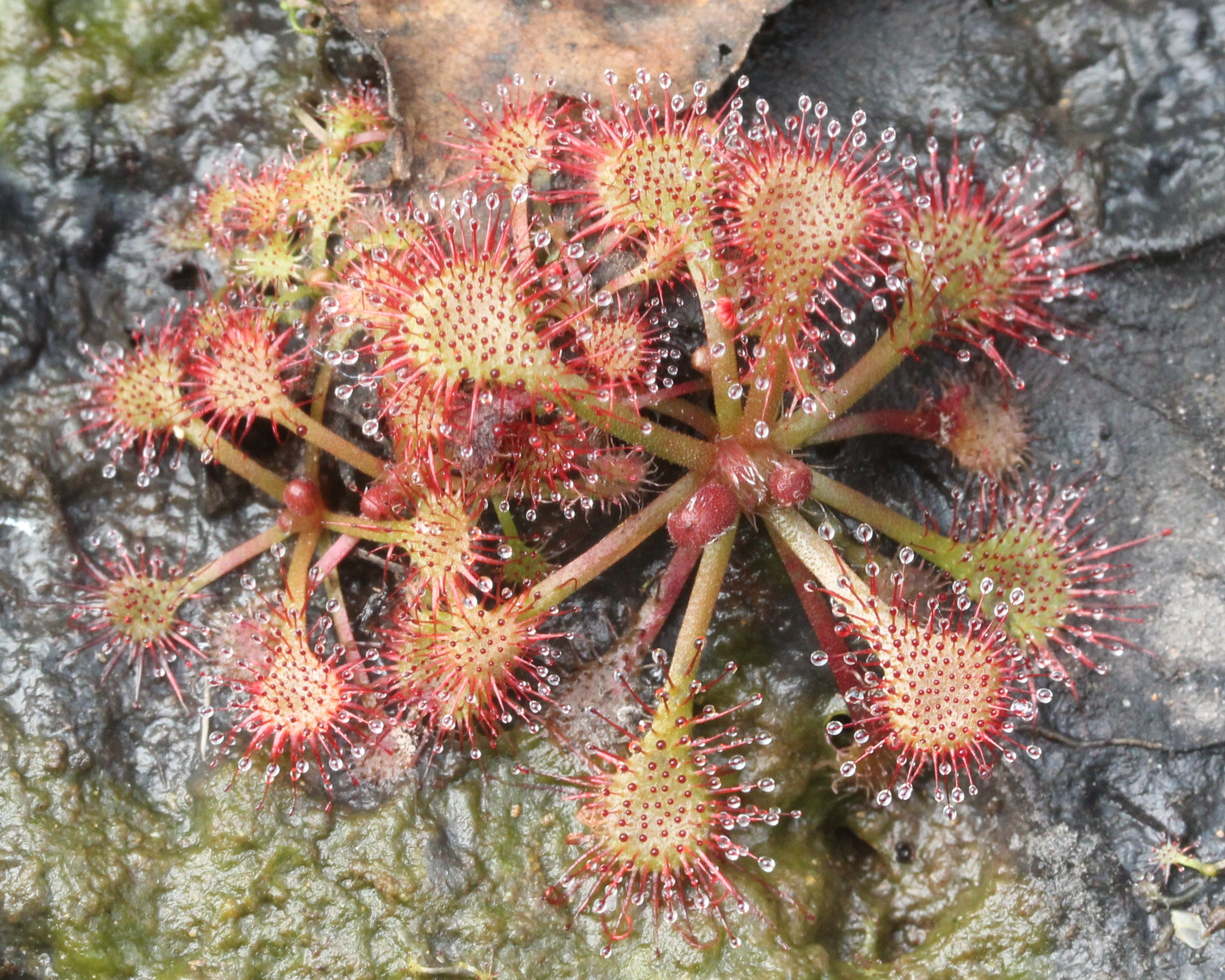
Leaf
