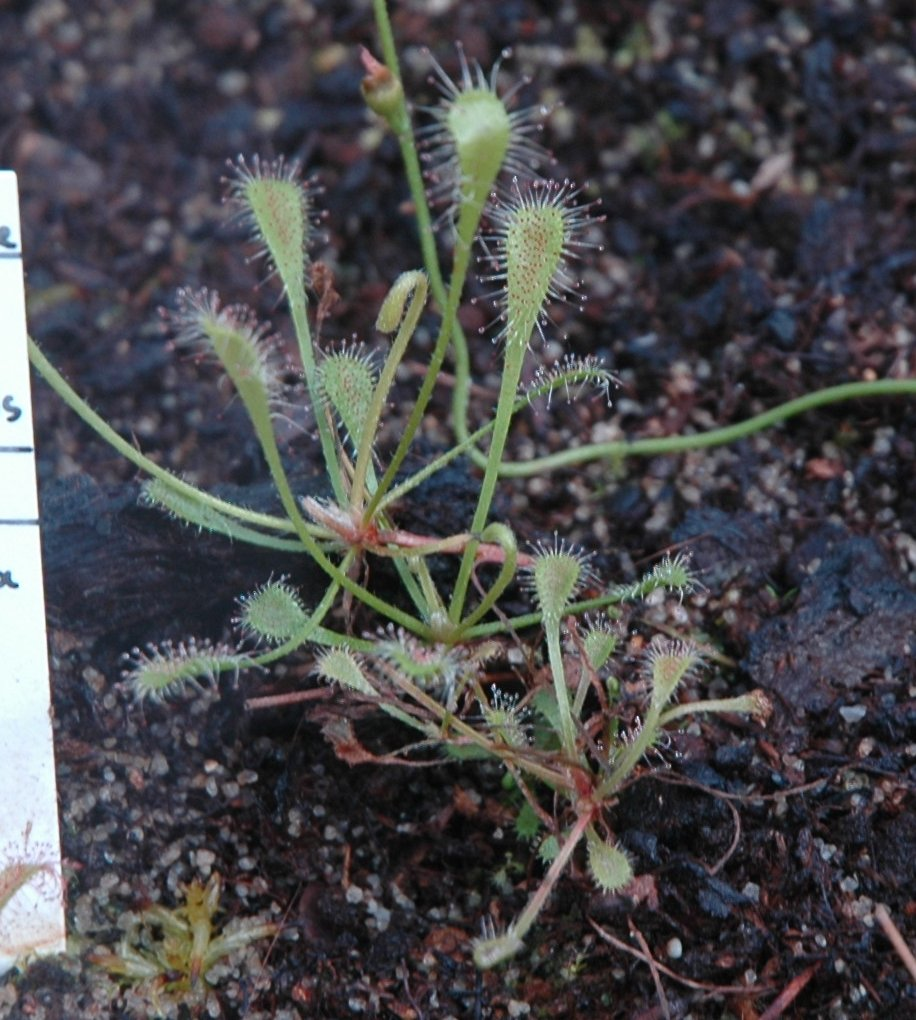

Scientific classification
- Kingdom: Plantae
- Clade: Tracheophytes
- Clade: Angiosperms
- Clade: Eudicots
- Order: Caryophyllales
- Family: Droseraceae
- Genus: Drosera
- Subgenus: Drosera subg. Drosera
- Section: Drosera sect. Drosera
- Species: D. nidiformis

Binomial name
- Drosera nidiformis Debbert

= Drosera nidiformis =

Species of carnivorous plant

Drosera nidiformis is a tropical African sundew. This plant is indigenous to KwaZulu-Natal in South Africa. Its classification is ambiguous; some sources refer to it as a synonym of Drosera dielsiana whereas others treat it as a separate species. This plant was previously known as Drosera "maglisburg".

== Description ==
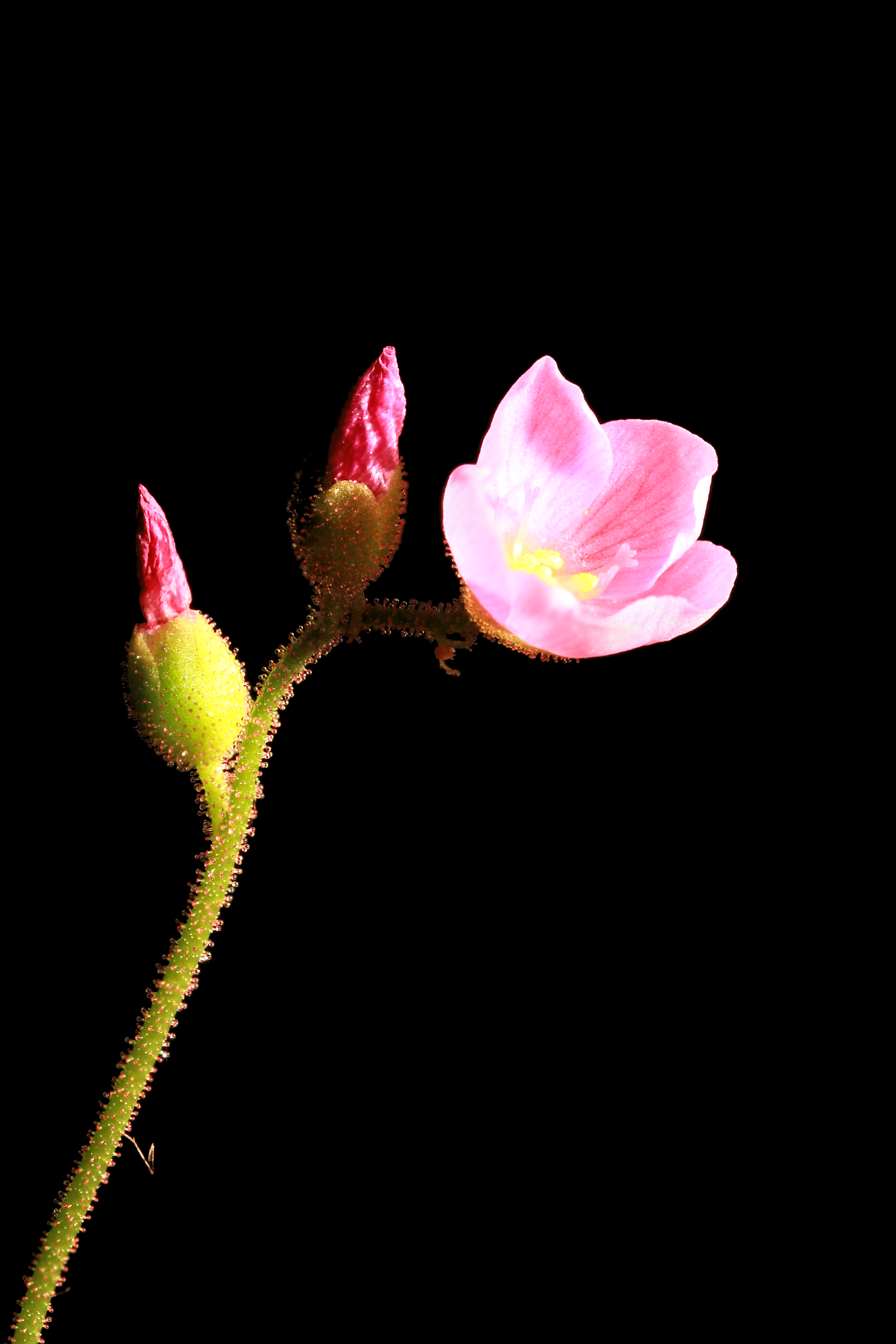
Flower of Drosera nidiformis

Leaves on mature specimens are obovate and range from 1 to 2 cm in length. Petioles can grow 1.5 to a maximum of approximately 5 cm. D. nidiformis exhibits a reddish tint if grown in the correct light conditions. Upon capture of prey, the leaf curls around it to bring it into contact with as many digestive glands as possible. This is an example of thigmotropism, or acting in response to a touch stimulus.

== Growth habit ==
Because it is from a subtropical climate, D. nidiformis does not tolerate cold temperatures and will not enter dormancy. It is a perennial plant. D. nidiformis, like most carnivorous plants, grows in nutrient-poor, acidic soil. If all growing conditions are not ideal, flowering has an exhausting effect on the plant.
