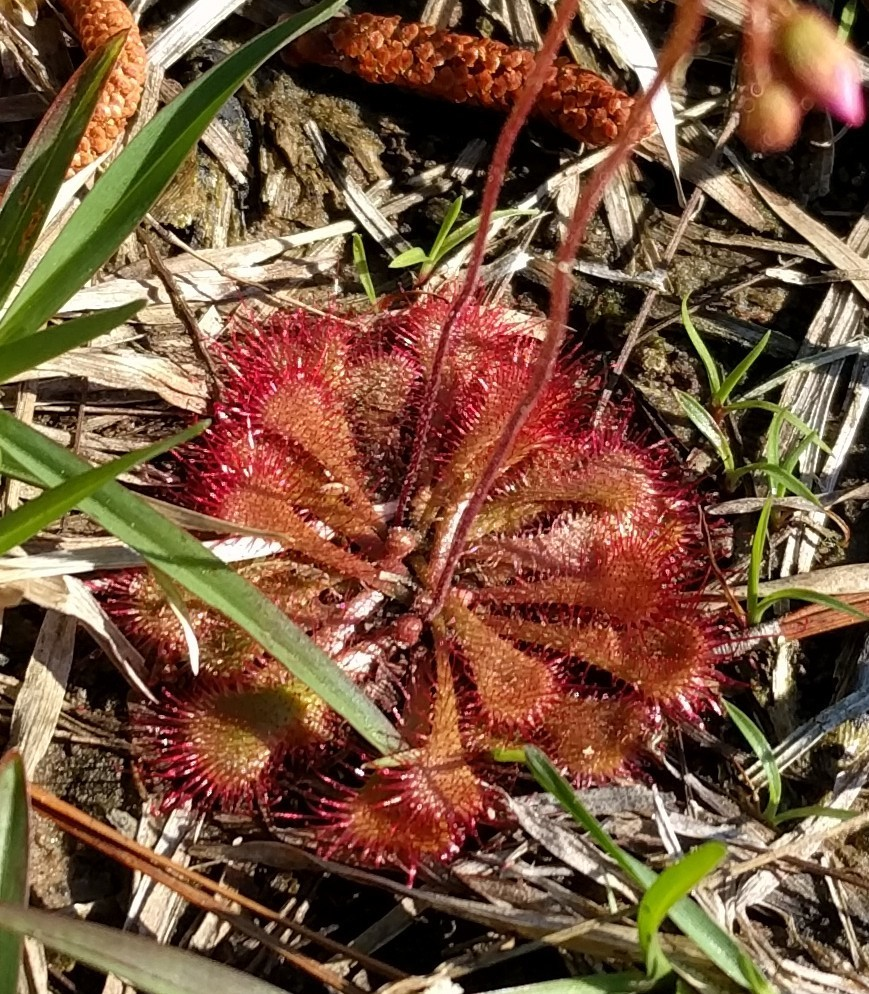

Scientific classification
- Kingdom: Plantae
- Clade: Tracheophytes
- Clade: Angiosperms
- Clade: Eudicots
- Order: Caryophyllales
- Family: Droseraceae
- Genus: Drosera
- Subgenus: Drosera subg. Drosera
- Section: Drosera sect. Drosera
- Species: D. brevifolia

Binomial name
- Drosera brevifolia Pursh 1814

= Drosera brevifolia =

Species of carnivorous plant

Drosera brevifolia (the dwarf, small or red sundew) is a carnivorous plant of the family Droseraceae native to the Americas. This species differs considerably from the pink sundew, Drosera capillaris, by its wedge-shaped leaves, and distinctly deeper red to reddish purple color, noticeable when side by side with D. capillaris.

According to the USDA, it is endangered in the State of Kentucky and threatened in the State of Tennessee.

== Description ==
D. brevifolia is usually a small plant, typically no more than 3 centimeters (1.2 in) across, though some are known to grow up to 5 cm (2.0 in), with flower spikes up to 15 cm (5.9 in). Its leaves are obovate to spatulate in shape, and range in length from 7 to 16 millimeters. It is often found growing in areas drier than what most carnivorous plants prefer. It tends to be biennial.

Flowers can be large compared to the rosette and can be pink or white and come in the spring.

== Distribution and habitat ==
This species can be found in the southeastern United States. Its range stretches from eastern Texas eastward to Florida, and north to Virginia.

D. brevifolia has been observed in environments with wet, peaty, or sandy soils. It has been found in habitats such as along the edges of marshes, ponds, and swamps.
