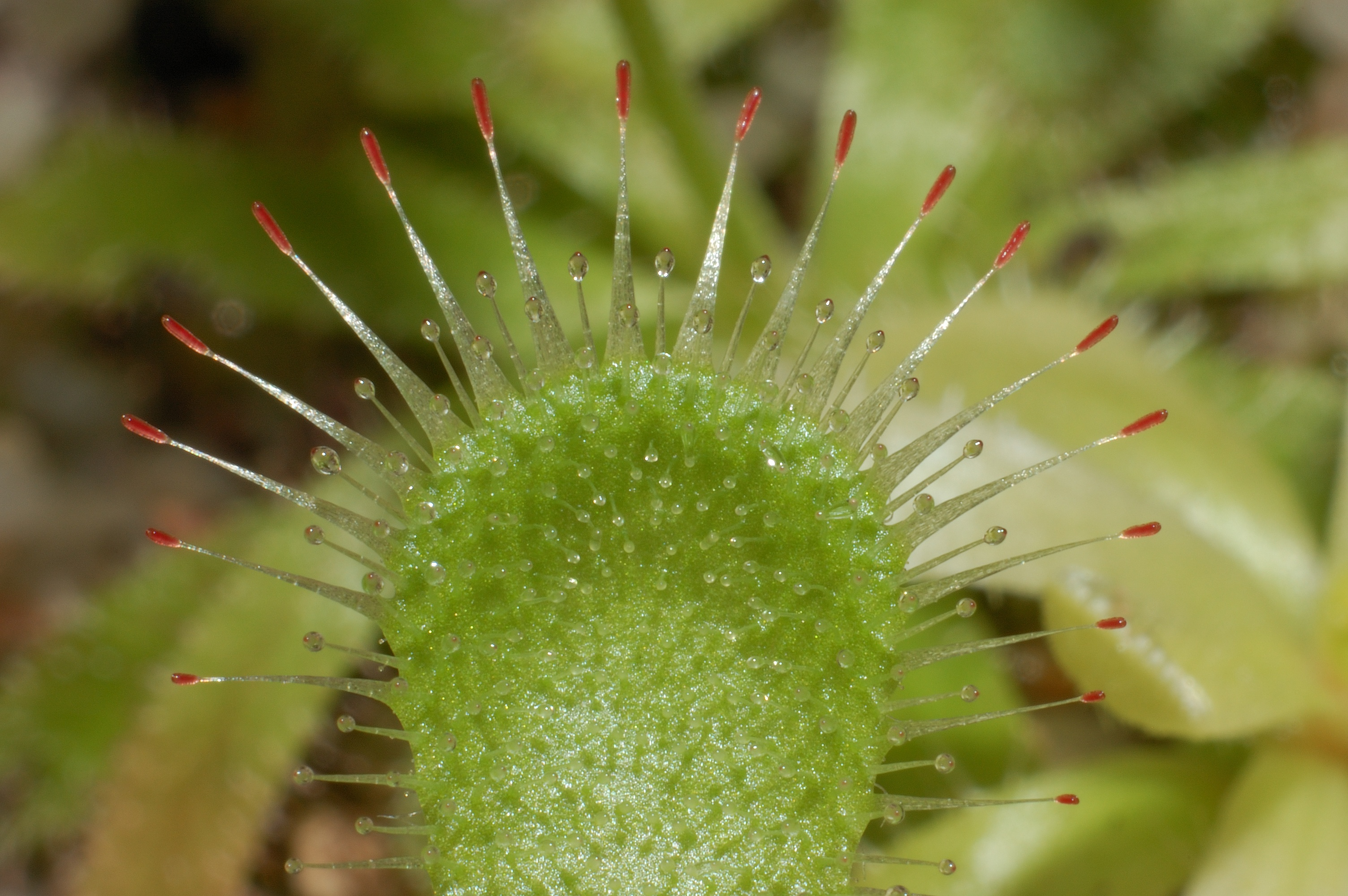
- Drosera pauciflora leaf

Scientific classification
- Kingdom: Plantae
- Clade: Tracheophytes
- Clade: Angiosperms
- Clade: Eudicots
- Order: Caryophyllales
- Family: Droseraceae
- Genus: Drosera
- Subgenus: Drosera subg. Drosera
- Section: Drosera sect. Drosera
- Species: D. pauciflora

Binomial name
- Drosera pauciflora Banks ex DC.

Synonyms
- Drosera acaulis, Drosera grandiflora

= Drosera pauciflora =

Species of carnivorous plant

Drosera pauciflora is a species of sundew, a carnivorous plant from the genus Drosera. It is native to the Western Cape of South Africa. Drosera pauciflora is closely related to Drosera cistiflora. D. pauciflora produces flowers during the spring on a stem coming out of the centre of the rosette, the flowers are pink.

== See also ==
- List of Drosera species
- Drosera cistiflora
