= Drosera zeyheri =

Scientific classification
- Kingdom: Plantae
- Clade: Tracheophytes
- Clade: Angiosperms
- Clade: Eudicots
- Order: Caryophyllales
- Family: Droseraceae
- Genus: Drosera
- Subgenus: Drosera subg. Drosera
- Section: Drosera sect. Drosera
- Species: D. zeyheri

Binomial name
- Drosera zeyheri T.M.Salter

Synonyms
- Drosera cistiflora L.

Species of carnivorous plant

Drosera zeyheri is a species in the carnivorous plant genus Drosera that is endemic to the Cape Provinces of South Africa. Some botanists treat this species to be a form of D. cistiflora. It differs from typical D. cistiflora specimens by being smaller, sometimes having cauline leaves on the short stems with white, pink, or red flowers. Botanist Fernando Rivadavia has said that he believes of all the forms and varieties in the D. cistiflora complex, D. zeyheri could possibly merit distinction at the species rank. He found it easy to distinguish it from D. cistiflora by its mostly stemless habit, though it often does present one to three leaves on the flower scape. Drosera zeyheri was first described by Terence Macleane Salter in a 1940 volume of the Journal of South African Botany.

== See also ==
- List of Drosera species
- Taxonomy of Drosera
