= Drosera solaris =

Scientific classification
- Kingdom: Plantae
- Clade: Tracheophytes
- Clade: Angiosperms
- Clade: Eudicots
- Order: Caryophyllales
- Family: Droseraceae
- Genus: Drosera
- Subgenus: Drosera subg. Drosera
- Section: Drosera sect. Drosera
- Species: D. solaris

Binomial name
- Drosera solaris A.Fleischm., Wistuba & S.McPherson (2007)

Species of carnivorous plant

Drosera solaris is a species of sundew native to the highlands of Guyana. It is thought to be most closely related to Drosera felix and Drosera kaieteurensis.
