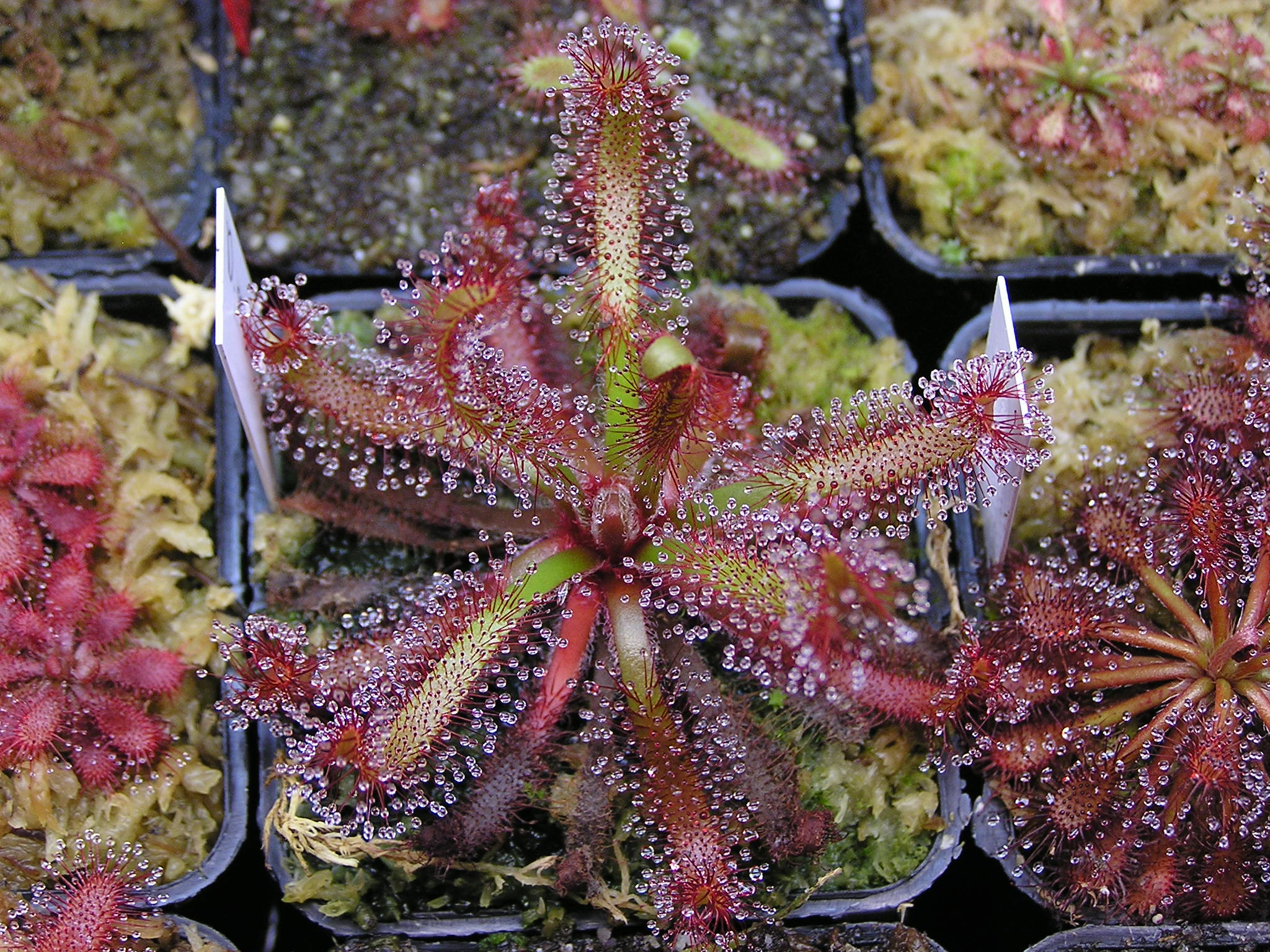

Scientific classification
- Kingdom: Plantae
- Clade: Embryophytes
- Clade: Tracheophytes
- Clade: Angiosperms
- Clade: Eudicots
- Order: Caryophyllales
- Family: Droseraceae
- Genus: Drosera
- Subgenus: Drosera subg. Drosera
- Section: Drosera sect. Drosera
- Species: D. ascendens

Binomial name
- Drosera ascendens A.St.-Hil.

= Drosera ascendens =

Species of flowering plant

Drosera ascendens is a perennial, rosette-forming carnivorous plant in the family Droseraceae. First described in 1826 by Augustin Saint-Hilaire, it is endemic to southeastern Brazil where it grows in campos rupestres montane grassland habitat.

== Description ==
The plant forms a rosette with a short, upright stem. The leaves are reddish and semi-erect.
