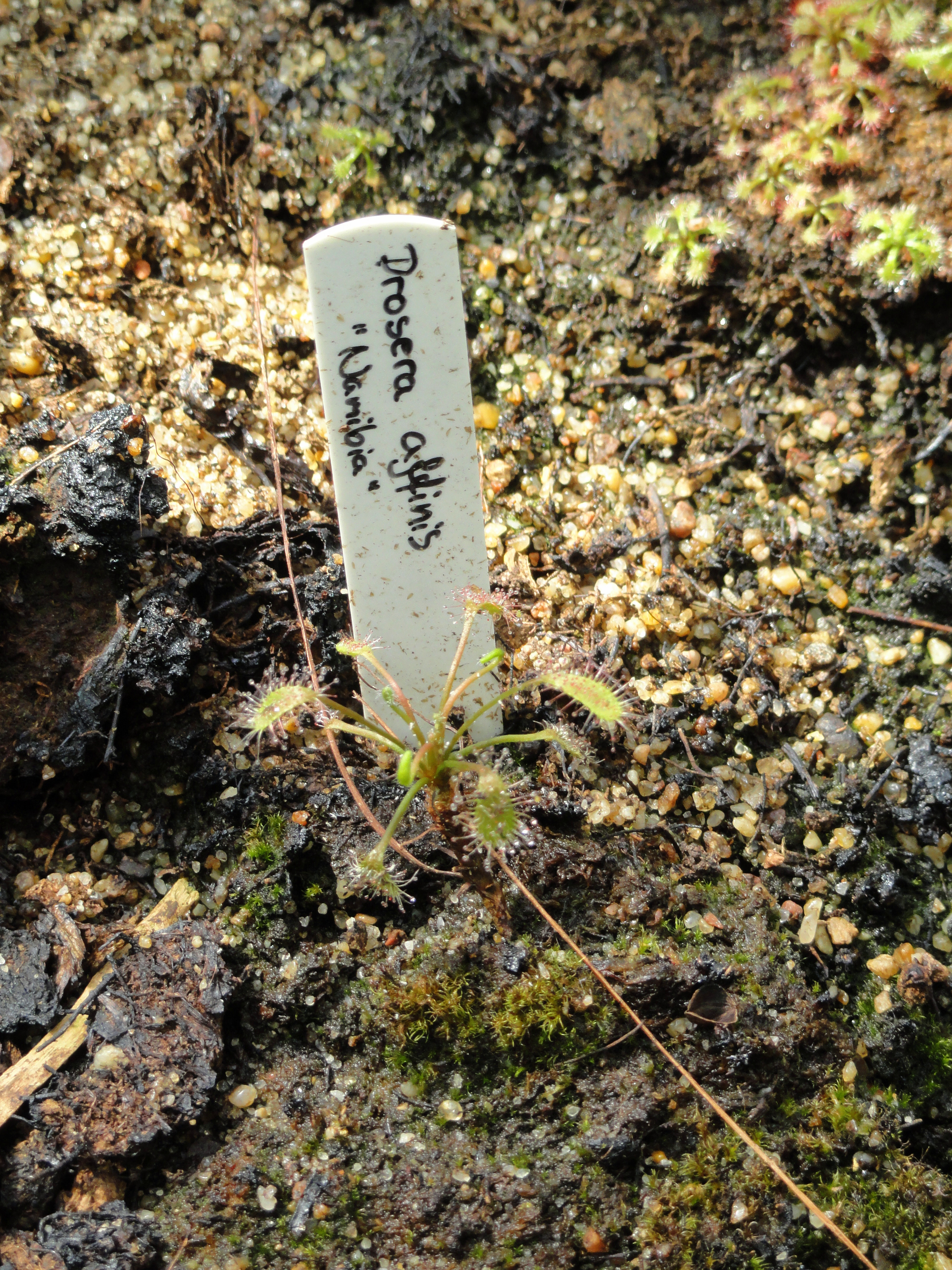

Scientific classification
- Kingdom: Plantae
- Clade: Tracheophytes
- Clade: Angiosperms
- Clade: Eudicots
- Order: Caryophyllales
- Family: Droseraceae
- Genus: Drosera
- Subgenus: Drosera subg. Drosera
- Section: Drosera sect. Drosera
- Species: D. affinis

Binomial name
- Drosera affinis Welw. ex Oliv.

= Drosera affinis =

Species of carnivorous plant

Drosera affinis is a carnivorous plant in the family Droseraceae. It is native to Southern Africa.

== Description ==
The leaves (including petioles) of Drosera affinis are around 9 cm (3.5 in) long. The plant can form a stem growing up to 10 cm (3.9 in) tall.

== Distribution ==
Drosera affinis is found in wet areas on the savannas of Angola, the Democratic Republic of the Congo, Malawi, Mozambique, Namibia, the Republic of the Congo, Tanzania, Zambia, and Zimbabwe.
