= Drosera atrostyla =

Scientific classification
- Kingdom: Plantae
- Clade: Embryophytes
- Clade: Tracheophytes
- Clade: Angiosperms
- Clade: Eudicots
- Order: Caryophyllales
- Family: Droseraceae
- Genus: Drosera
- Subgenus: Drosera subg. Drosera
- Section: Drosera sect. Drosera
- Species: D. atrostyla

Binomial name
- Drosera atrostyla Debbert

Species of flowering plant

Drosera atrostyla is a carnivorous plant in the family Droseraceae. It is endemic to the Cape Provinces of South Africa.
