= Drosera amazonica =

Scientific classification
- Kingdom: Plantae
- Clade: Tracheophytes
- Clade: Angiosperms
- Clade: Eudicots
- Order: Caryophyllales
- Family: Droseraceae
- Genus: Drosera
- Subgenus: Drosera subg. Drosera
- Section: Drosera sect. Drosera
- Species: D. amazonica

Binomial name
- Drosera amazonica Rivadavia, A.Fleischm. & Vicent.

Species of carnivorous plant

Drosera amazonica is a species of sundew native to northern Brazil. It was first described by Fernando Rivadavia, Andreas Fleischmann and Alberto Vicentini in 2009.

== Description ==
D. amazonica forms a small rosette of semi-erect leaves at the end of a short, unbranched stem up to 10–14 cm (3.9–5.5 in) long. The leaves have a distinct petiole, 5–10 mm (0.20–0.39 in) long and 1–3 mm (0.04–0.12 in) wide, flat and tapering toward the lamina, which is spoon-shaped to egg-shaped, 2.5–5 mm (0.10–0.20 in) long and 1–3 mm (0.04–0.12 in) wide.

== See also ==
- List of Drosera species
