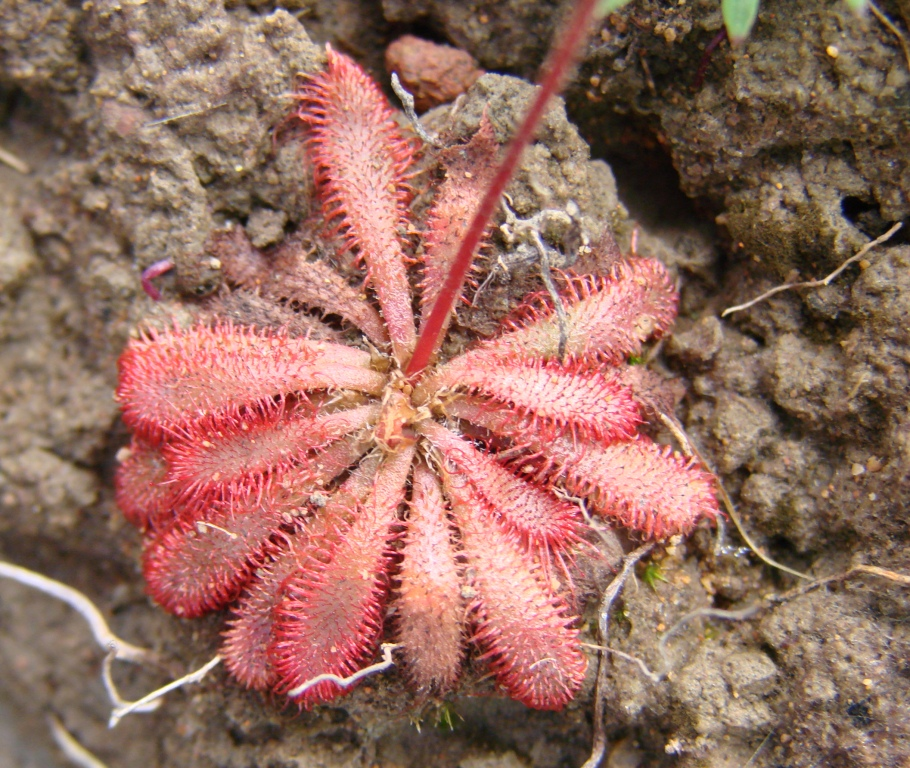

Scientific classification
- Kingdom: Plantae
- Clade: Tracheophytes
- Clade: Angiosperms
- Clade: Eudicots
- Order: Caryophyllales
- Family: Droseraceae
- Genus: Drosera
- Subgenus: Drosera subg. Drosera
- Section: Drosera sect. Drosera
- Species: D. tomentosa

Binomial name
- Drosera tomentosa A.St.-Hil.

Synonyms
- D. montana var. tomentosa (A.St.-Hil.) Diels; D. tomentosa var. glabrata A.St.-Hil.

= Drosera tomentosa =

Species of carnivorous plant

Drosera tomentosa is a species in the carnivorous plant genus Drosera that is endemic to Brazil. It was originally described in 1824 by Augustin Saint-Hilaire. In 1906, Ludwig Diels reduced the species to a variety of D. montana. Diels' taxonomic rank for the species is still supported by some.

== See also ==
- List of Drosera species
