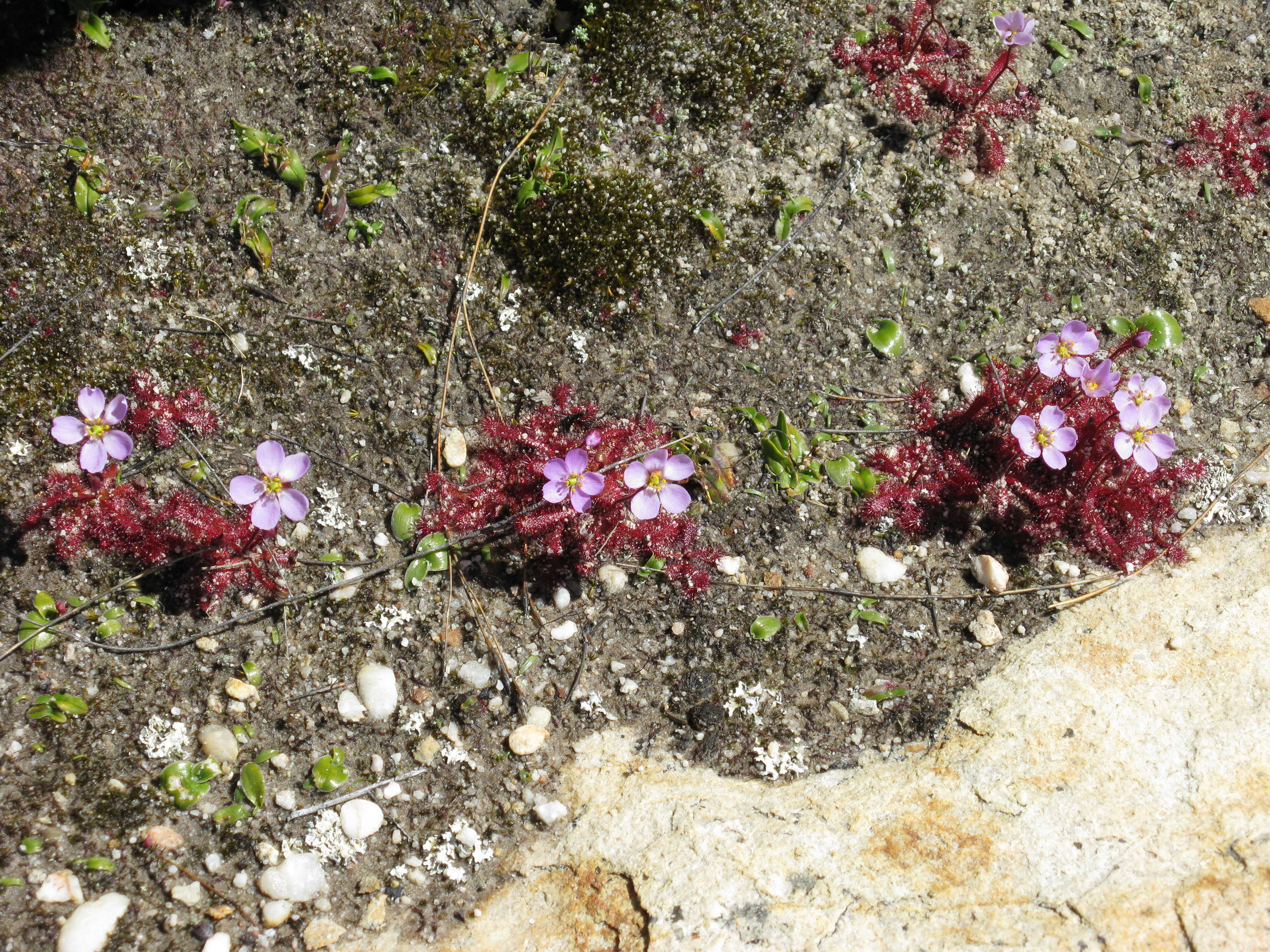
- Drosera acaulis growing in Cederberg, South Africa

Scientific classification
- Kingdom: Plantae
- Clade: Tracheophytes
- Clade: Angiosperms
- Clade: Eudicots
- Order: Caryophyllales
- Family: Droseraceae
- Genus: Drosera
- Subgenus: Drosera subg. Drosera
- Section: Drosera sect. Drosera
- Species: D. acaulis

Binomial name
- Drosera acaulis L.f.

= Drosera acaulis =

Species of carnivorous plant

Drosera acaulis is a small rosette-forming carnivorous plant in to the family Droseraceae. It is endemic to the south-west Cape Province of South Africa and was first described by Carl Linnaeus the Younger in his 1781 Supplementum Plantarum.

D. acaulis is a dwarf, rosulate herb with 1-2 thin roots. Leaves are 8 apetiolate, exstipulate, unequal in length, lamina narrowly spathulate approximately 7 mm long and 2 mm wide, bearing both type of tentacles, otherwise glabrous. Flower solitary on a pedicel 1–2 mm long, glandular pubescent. Calyx lobes c. 3 mm long. Petals obovate, c. 6 mm long, red or purple. Stamens with terete foments, the connective not rhomboidal. Styles forked from the base, stigmatic apex flabellately multifid.
