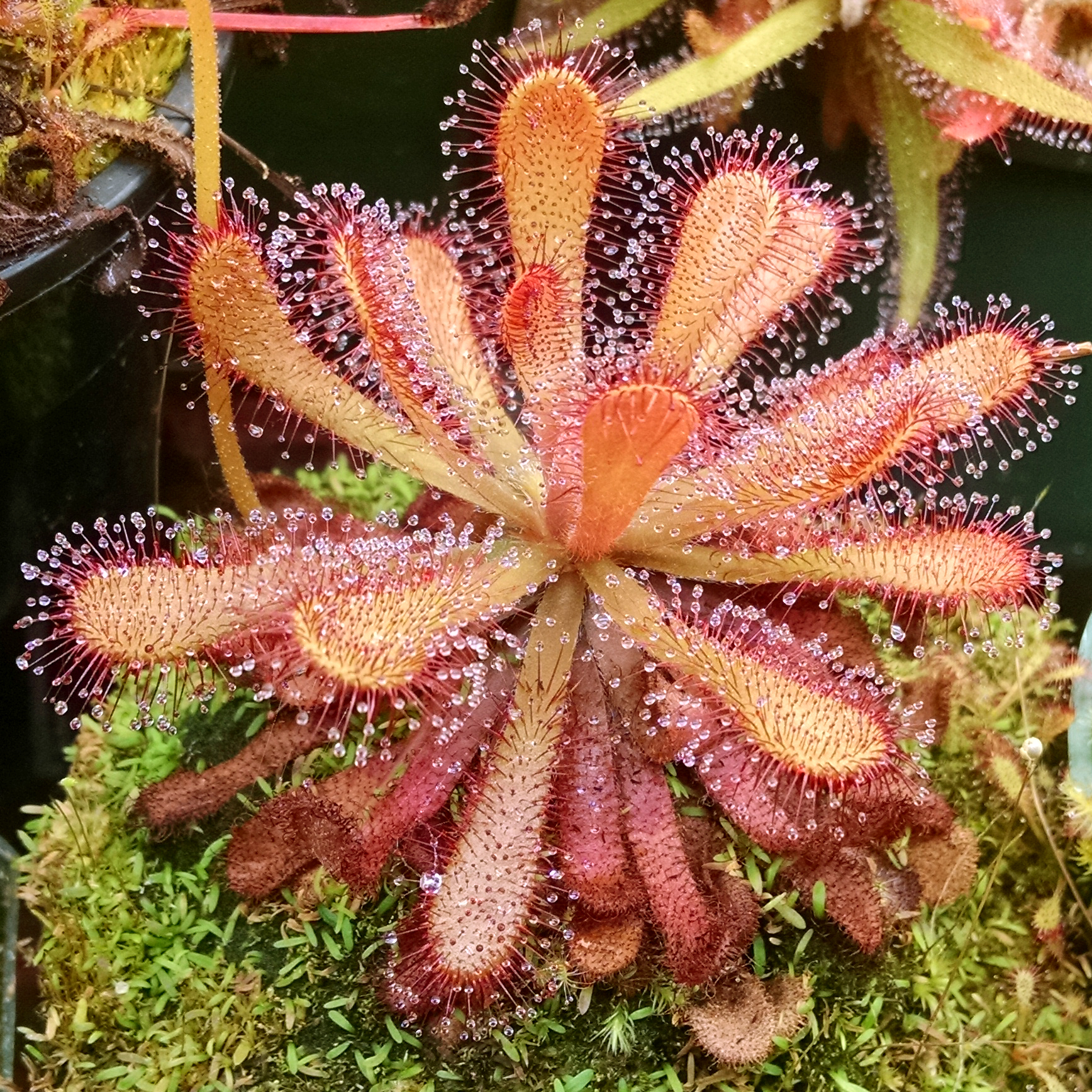

Scientific classification
- Kingdom: Plantae
- Clade: Tracheophytes
- Clade: Angiosperms
- Clade: Eudicots
- Order: Caryophyllales
- Family: Droseraceae
- Genus: Drosera
- Subgenus: Drosera subg. Drosera
- Section: Drosera sect. Drosera
- Species: D. venusta

Binomial name
- Drosera venusta P.Debbert

= Drosera venusta =

Species of carnivorous plant

Drosera venusta is a subtropical sundew endemic to the Cape Provinces of South Africa. It was described as a new species by Paul Debbert in 1987. Some have questioned its specific rank, noting its affinity to D. natalensis, while others have reduced it to a synonym of D. natalensis.

== See also ==
- List of Drosera species
