= Drosera arachnoides =

Scientific classification
- Kingdom: Plantae
- Clade: Embryophytes
- Clade: Tracheophytes
- Clade: Angiosperms
- Clade: Eudicots
- Order: Caryophyllales
- Family: Droseraceae
- Genus: Drosera
- Subgenus: Drosera subg. Drosera
- Section: Drosera sect. Drosera
- Species: D. arachnoides

Binomial name
- Drosera arachnoides Rakotoar. & A.Fleischm.

Species of flowering plant

Drosera arachnoides is a carnivorous plant in the family Droseraceae. It is endemic to Madagascar.

== Description ==
Drosera arachnoides is similar to the closely related Drosera humbertii. Its leaves are 22–40 mm (0.87–1.57 in) long, and a mature plant can have a stem that is 25–45 mm (0.98–1.77 in) tall.

== Distribution ==
Drosera arachnoides is native to the Fianarantsoa and Toamasina provinces of Madagascar.
