= Drosera villosa =

Scientific classification
- Kingdom: Plantae
- Clade: Tracheophytes
- Clade: Angiosperms
- Clade: Eudicots
- Order: Caryophyllales
- Family: Droseraceae
- Genus: Drosera
- Subgenus: Drosera subg. Drosera
- Section: Drosera sect. Drosera
- Species: D. villosa

Binomial name
- Drosera villosa A.St.-Hil.

Species of carnivorous plant

Drosera villosa is a species of sundew native to south-east Brazil. It was originally described by Augustin Saint-Hilaire in 1826.

== See also ==
- List of Drosera species
