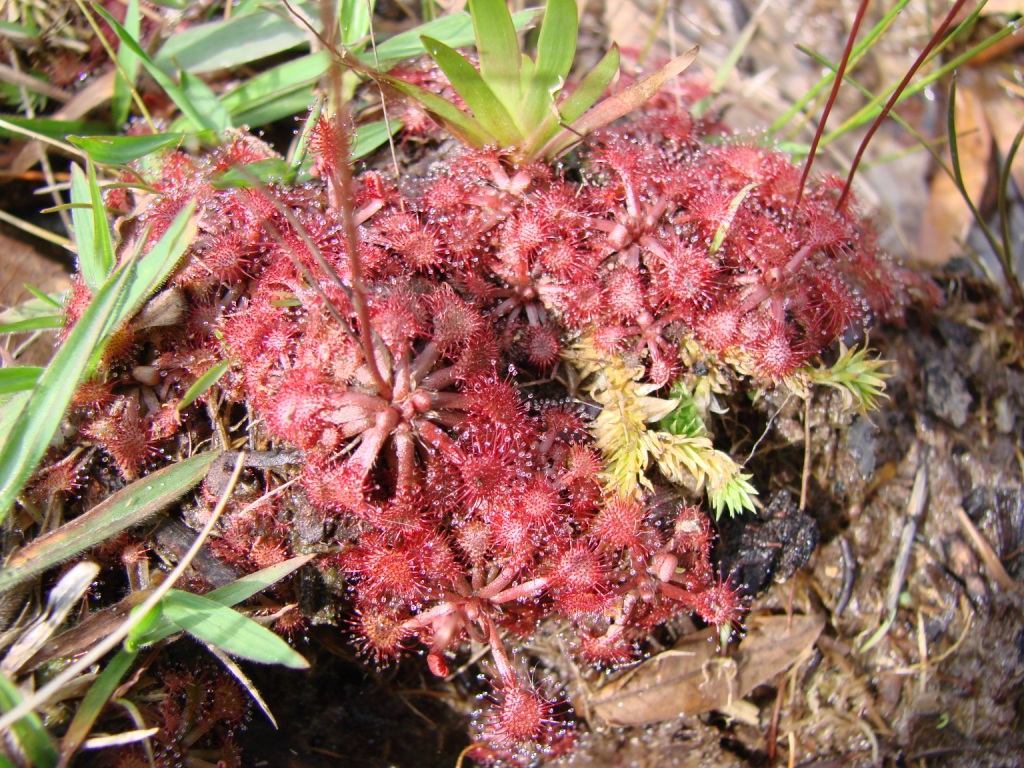

Conservation status
- Secure (NatureServe)

Scientific classification
- Kingdom: Plantae
- Clade: Tracheophytes
- Clade: Angiosperms
- Clade: Eudicots
- Order: Caryophyllales
- Family: Droseraceae
- Genus: Drosera
- Subgenus: Drosera subg. Drosera
- Section: Drosera sect. Drosera
- Species: D. capillaris

Binomial name
- Drosera capillaris Poir.

Synonyms
- Drosera communis var. breviscapa C.Wright ex Griseb.; Drosera communis var. cubensis M.Gómez, nom. nud.; Drosera minor Alph.Wood, nom. illeg.; Drosera tenella Willd. ex Schult.

= Drosera capillaris =

Species of carnivorous plant

Drosera capillaris, also known as the pink sundew, is a species of carnivorous plant belonging to the family Droseraceae. It is native to the southern United States, the Greater Antilles, western and southern Mexico, Central America, and northern South America. It is critically endangered in some places and thrives in unique conditions like fires, as it allows new growth to flourish. The prey they capture gives them the majority of their nutrients and allows them to live in nutrient lacking environments. It's danger to being extinct is influenced by pollution. Human collection and hobbyists are also directly impacting the survival of this species and it is affecting surrounding species.

== Description ==
Drosera capillaris is a perennial and herbaceous plant which forms mostly prostrate (but occasionally upright) rosettes. In more temperate regions, it grows as an annual. They can reach a diameter of 3 inches (7.6 cm) at their largest. Individual leaf blades typically range from 0.5 inches (1.3 cm) to 1 inch (2.5 cm) in length. Their inflorescences can reach heights of 4 inches (10 cm) to 14 inches (36 cm), forming a one sided raceme, with 1 to 6 pink, or rarely, white blooms. Flowers mature to an ovoid capsule, roughly 1/8 inch (0.32 cm) long. They typically flower from May to August.

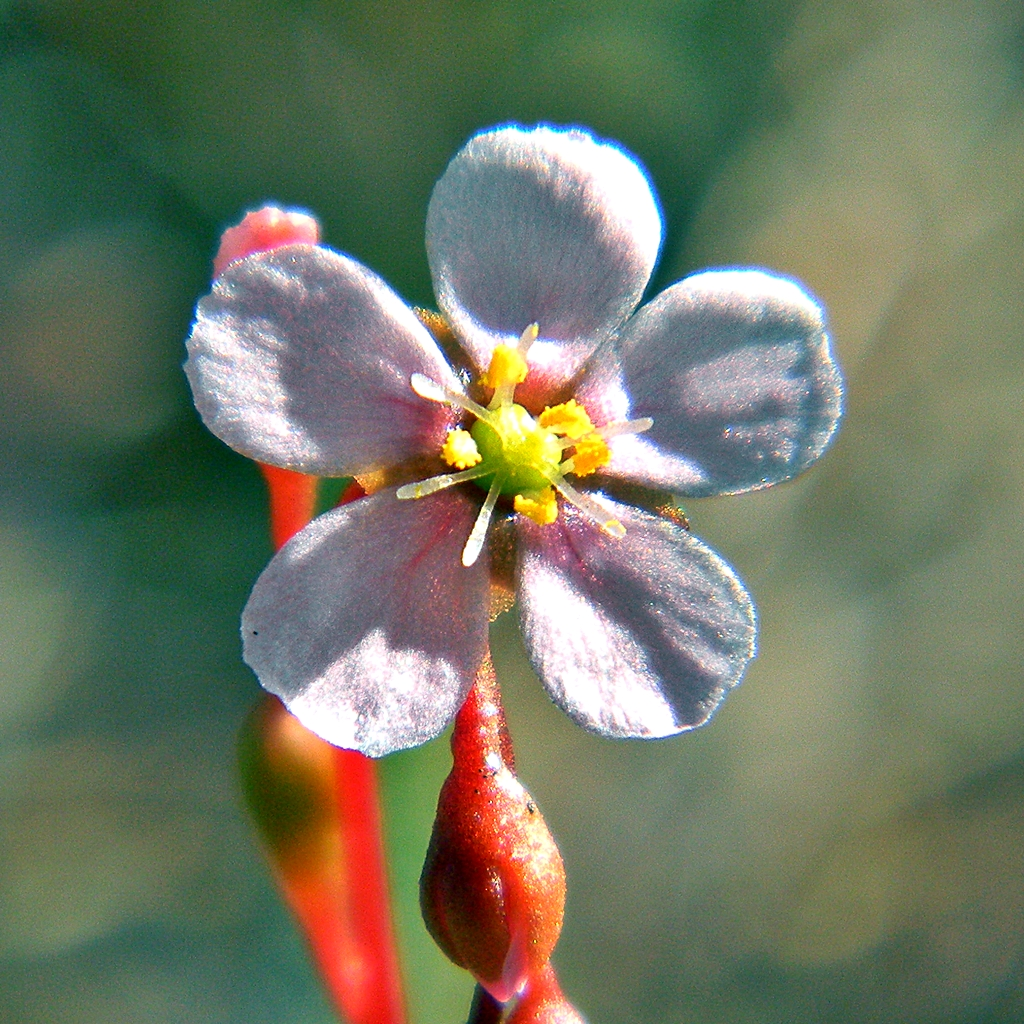
Flower

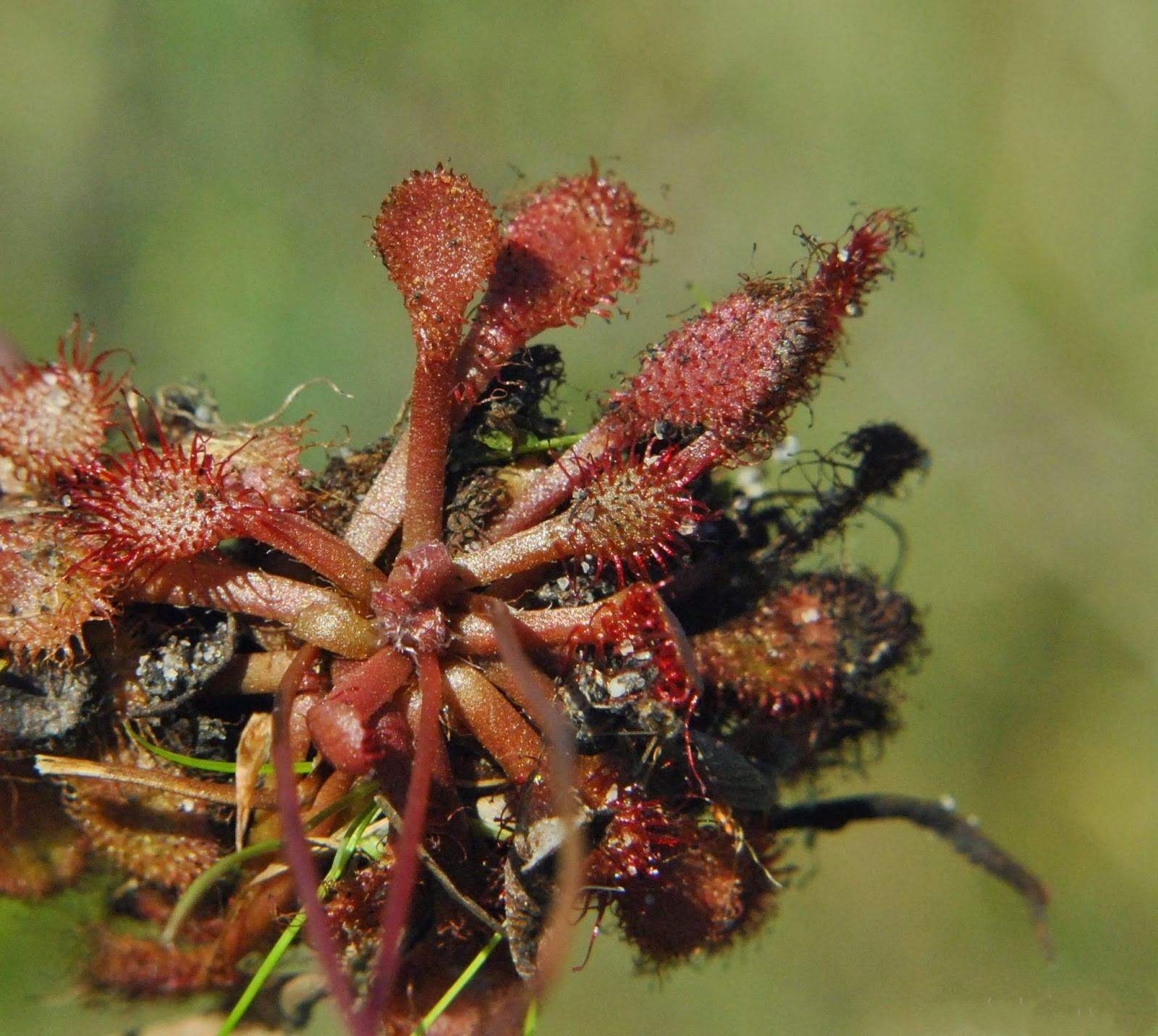
Ovoid capsule

D. capillaris can be confused with D. intermedia (spoonleaf sundew) especially when young, as both form flat rosettes and inhabit the same habitats. However D. capillaris petioles are sparsely pilose, while D. intermedia is glabrous. Like all members of its genus, D. capillaris leaf blades are covered in glandular trichomes which excrete a sugary mucilage. Small invertebrates then become trapped by the hairs, and are subsequently digested by enzymes. The trichomes act similarly to tentacles, closing around trapped organisms further ensnaring them.

== Habitat and ecology ==
Drosera capillaris occurs in subtropical to tropical seepage bogs, savannas, and grasslands often dominated by species of pine, including Pinus palustris (longleaf), P. elliottii (slash), or P. caribaea (Caribbean). Such habitats are subject to frequent fires (but less than their upland counterparts, which often are subject to seasonal burns). Like other species of sundew, D. capillaris is fire adapted, as elimination of competing plants facilitates proliferation of seedlings. Thus reducing surrounding combative plants lets Drosera and other carnivorous plants reestablish itself in the local environment. Thick clay deposits both prevent the establishment of large trees or shrubs, and trap water. The resulting habitat are sunny but always wet. These habitats are highly acidic, sandy, and nutrient deficient, incentivizing carnivory. Drosera are allowed to flourish in these nutrient deficient environments since they take in a lot of nutrients from the prey they capture. The harsh environments they usually live in also lead to the evolution of roots that can handle low nourishment and stabilize itself into the ground. In North America, D capillaris grows concurrently with other unrelated species of carnivorous plants such as Sarracenia species (pitcher plants), Pingucula species (butterworts), and Utricularia species (bladderworts), as well as other species of Drosera. Across their entire range, other common coexisting species include orchids, Eleocharis species (spikerushes), Rhynchospora species (breaksedges), and Paspalum species.

== Conservation ==
More than half of all species of carnivorous plants are identified as endangered, this is most likely due to the specific conditions in which they require to thrive and by cause of human actions. These plants are often collected, decreasing their already low populations and relocated in new environments where they do not belong. Pollution also greatly impacts the heath of these plants, this pollution could come from fertilizers or nutrient addition that only benefit certain desired crops. Occasionally clearing out competing plants is helpful for the spread of Drosera seedlings as mentioned previously with fire; however it is crucial to remove the dead byproduct after to allow for the new growth. Such specific environment has led to its decline over the years. Drosera capillaris is now listed as vulnerable in the US state of Virginia, and critically imperiled in Arkansas, Maryland, and Tennessee.

== Human use ==
Carnivorous plants are often collected and sought after by humans, as they are seen as unique and exotic. Due to this high demand, there is a large illegal market where collectors will breed and sell these plants but with the cost of disturbing the natural environment they grow in. Horticulture cultivation is often pursued by sellers with the idea of conserving and increasing the amount of produce, but this only temporarily creates an abundance of certain desired traits. The species associated with this plant are affected and the plants are not assimilating in their environment because of their controlled growth. Drosera are highly targeted due to their medicinal use for the respiratory system. This is most common in different areas/countries of Europe and is commonly bought air dried, in some areas it can even sold pharmaceutically. Horticulture is often not accepted in the pharmaceutical industry to the plants being synthetically fed and their genetic material being too similar.
