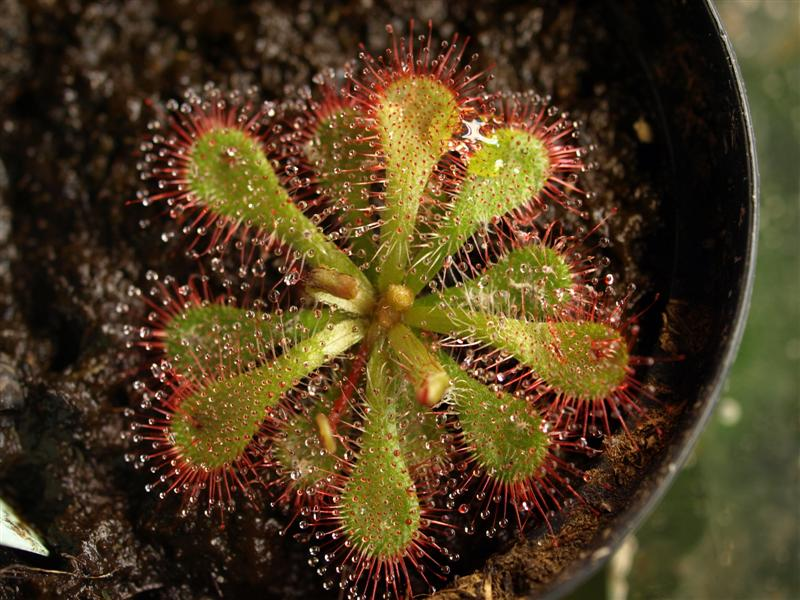

Conservation status
- Least Concern (IUCN 3.1)

Scientific classification
- Kingdom: Plantae
- Clade: Tracheophytes
- Clade: Angiosperms
- Clade: Eudicots
- Order: Caryophyllales
- Family: Droseraceae
- Genus: Drosera
- Subgenus: Drosera subg. Drosera
- Section: Drosera sect. Drosera
- Species: D. dielsiana

Binomial name
- Drosera dielsiana Exell & J.R.Laundon

= Drosera dielsiana =

Species of carnivorous plant

Drosera dielsiana is a compact rosetted sundew native to South Africa (KwaZulu-Natal, the Free State, the Northern Provinces), Eswatini (Swaziland), Mozambique, Malawi, and Zimbabwe. It was described as a new species by Arthur Wallis Exell and Jack Rodney Laundon in 1956. The diploid chromosome number is 2n=40. It was named in honor of Ludwig Diels, the author of the 1906 monograph on the Droseraceae.

== See also ==
- List of Drosera species
