= Drosera arenicola =

Scientific classification
- Kingdom: Plantae
- Clade: Tracheophytes
- Clade: Angiosperms
- Clade: Eudicots
- Order: Caryophyllales
- Family: Droseraceae
- Genus: Drosera
- Subgenus: Drosera subg. Drosera
- Section: Drosera sect. Drosera
- Species: D. arenicola

Binomial name
- Drosera arenicola Steyerm.

Species of carnivorous plant

Drosera arenicola is a species of sundew endemic to Venezuela. It was first described by Julian Alfred Steyermark in 1952.

== Distribution ==
D. arenicola is an upland species found only in Amazonas and Bolívar states in Venezuela. It has been collected from elevations above 1,200 m (3,900 ft) including on tepui plateaus.

== Characteristics ==
A perennial sundew forming compact rosettes of linear-spathulate, semi-erect leaves. As the leaves age they reflex markedly. The plant gradually forms an upright stem of old dead growth and can attain a height of 6 cm. White flowers are held on short scapes up to 1.5 cm tall.
