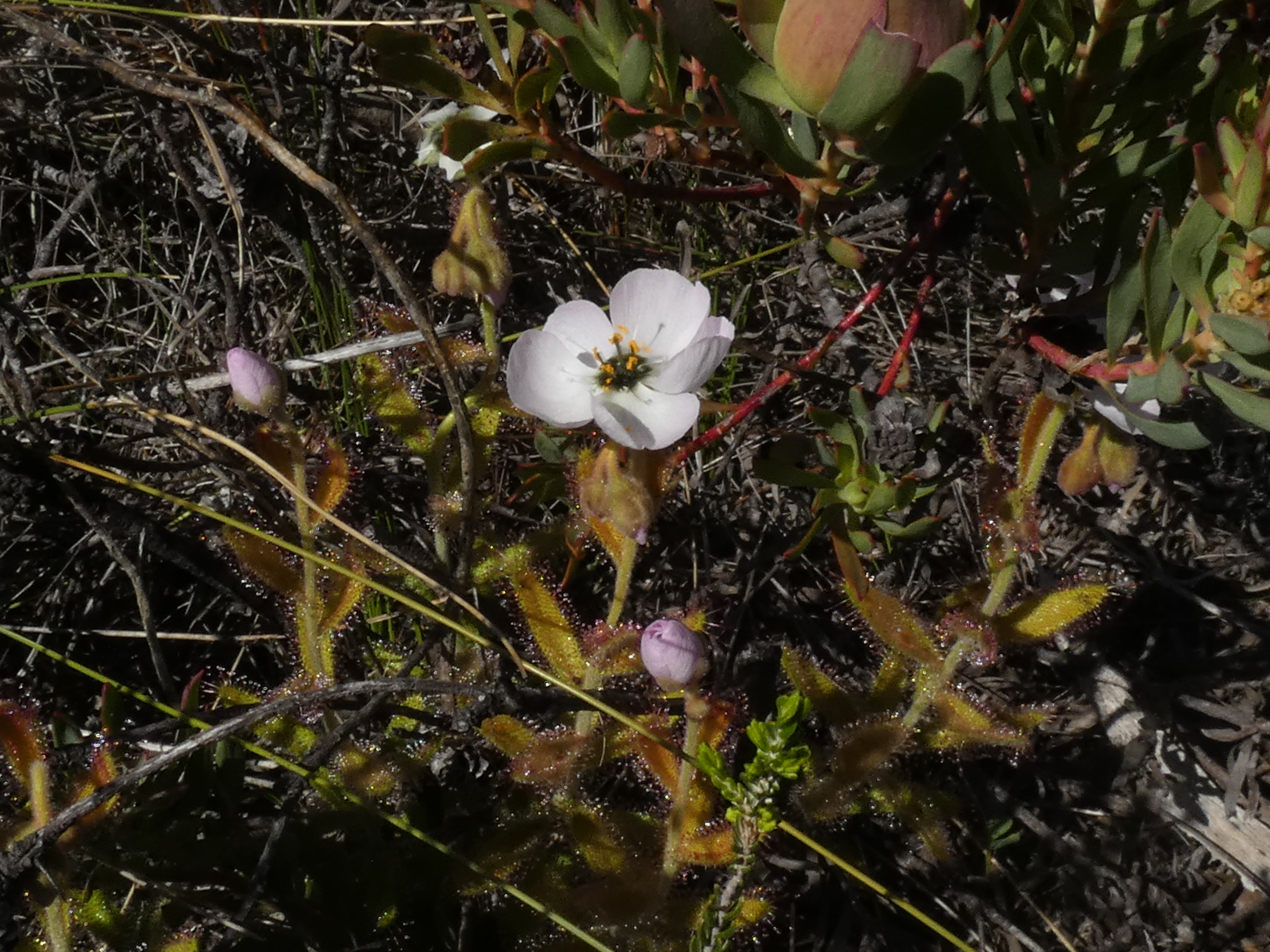
- Drosera cistiflora, at Hangklip, near Pringle Bay
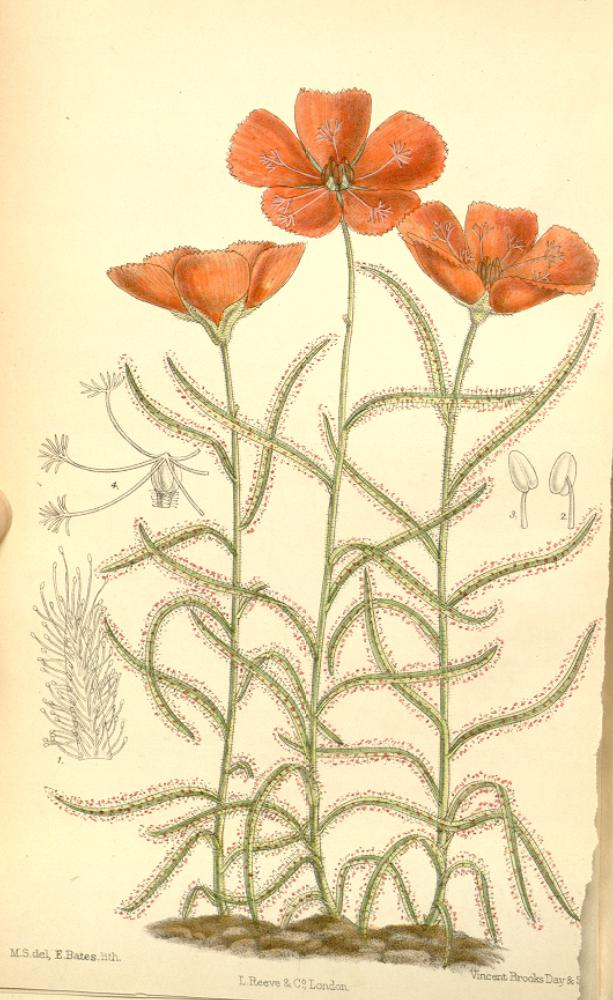
- Illustration of Drosera cistiflora from Curtis's Botanical Magazine, 1890

Conservation status
- Least Concern (SANBI Red List)

Scientific classification
- Kingdom: Plantae
- Clade: Tracheophytes
- Clade: Angiosperms
- Clade: Eudicots
- Order: Caryophyllales
- Family: Droseraceae
- Genus: Drosera
- Subgenus: Drosera subg. Drosera
- Section: Drosera sect. Drosera
- Species: D. cistiflora

Binomial name
- Drosera cistiflora L.

= Drosera cistiflora =

Species of carnivorous plant

Drosera cistiflora, also called the poppy-flowered sundew, is a carnivorous species in the sundew family, known for its unusually large flowers. It is native to Southern Africa.

== Distribution and habitat ==
Drosera cistiflora is found in the winter-rainfall regions of the Cape Provinces in South Africa.

== Conservation status ==
Drosera cistiflora has been classified as least concern by SANBI in the Red List of South African Plants.

== Gallery ==
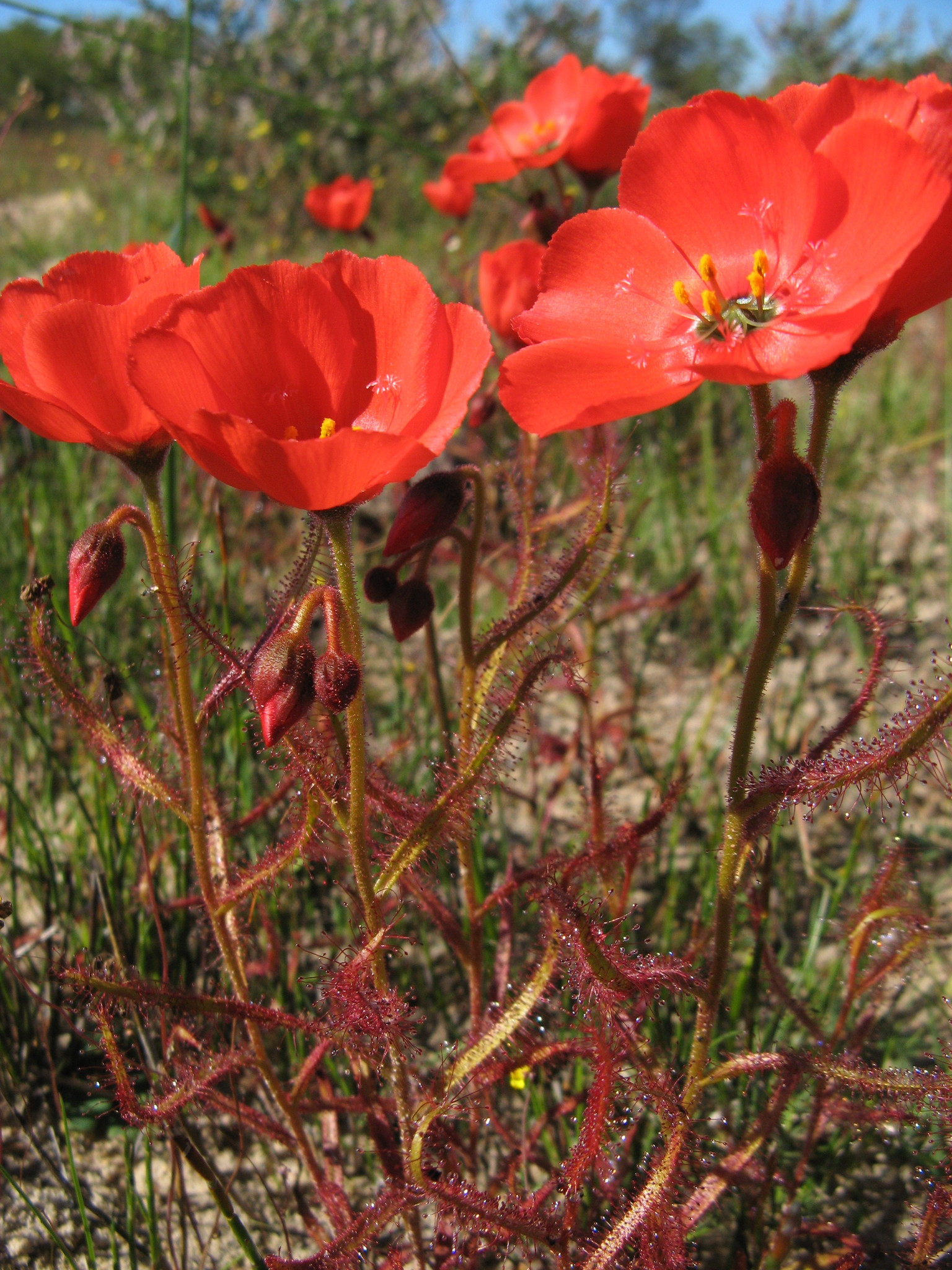
Red form found in the Darling area, in Namaqualand

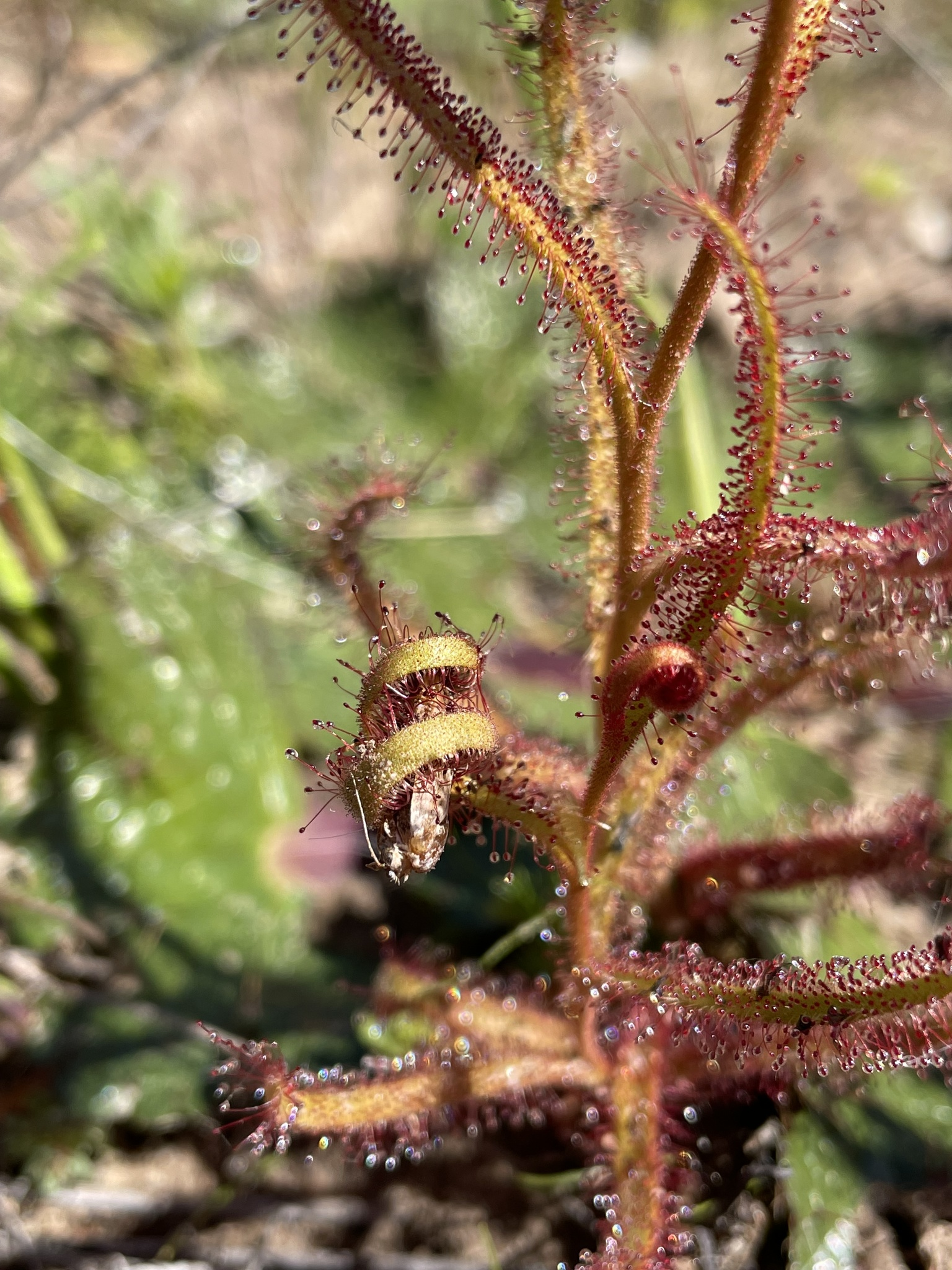
Stems

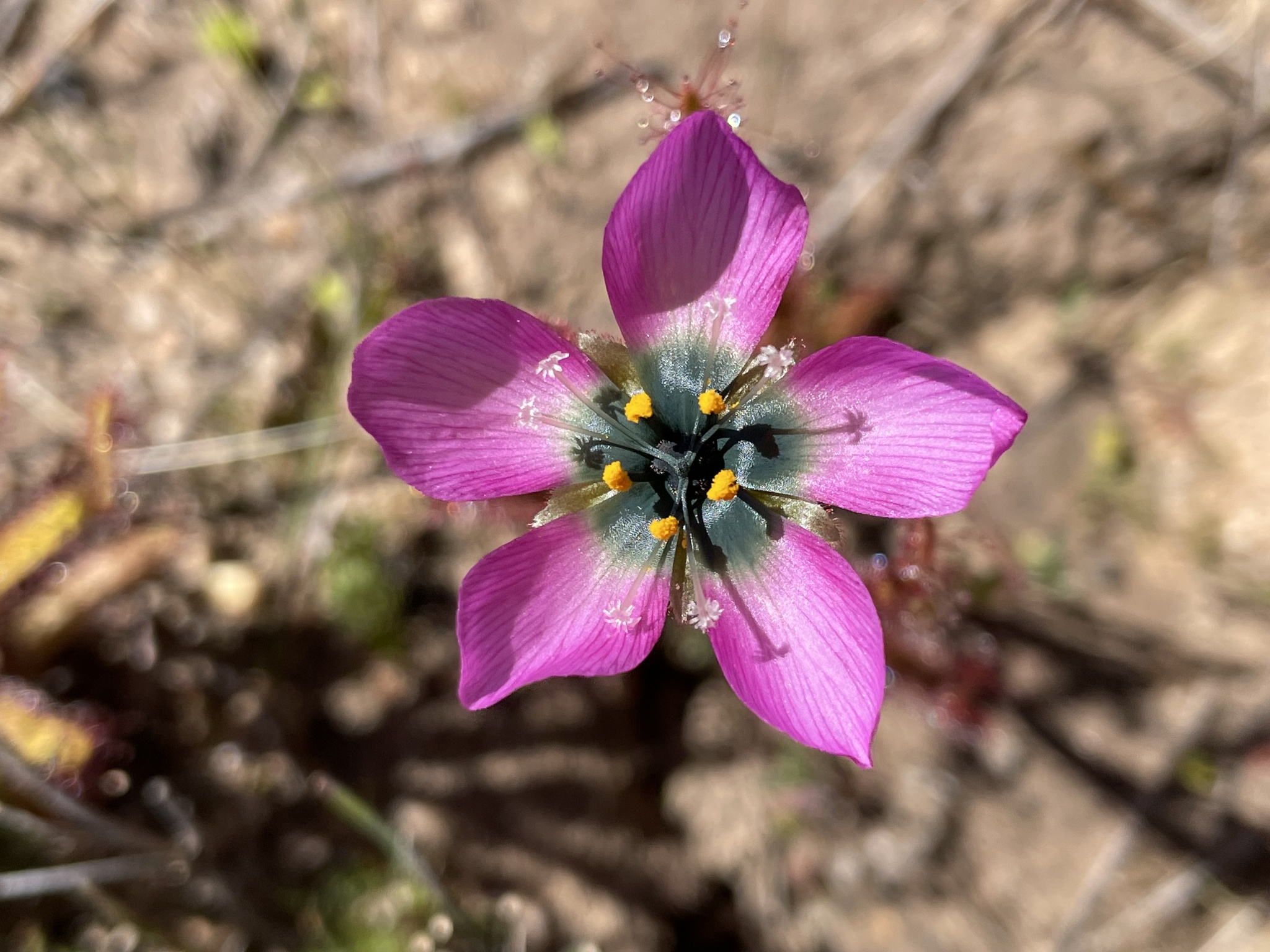
Pink form
