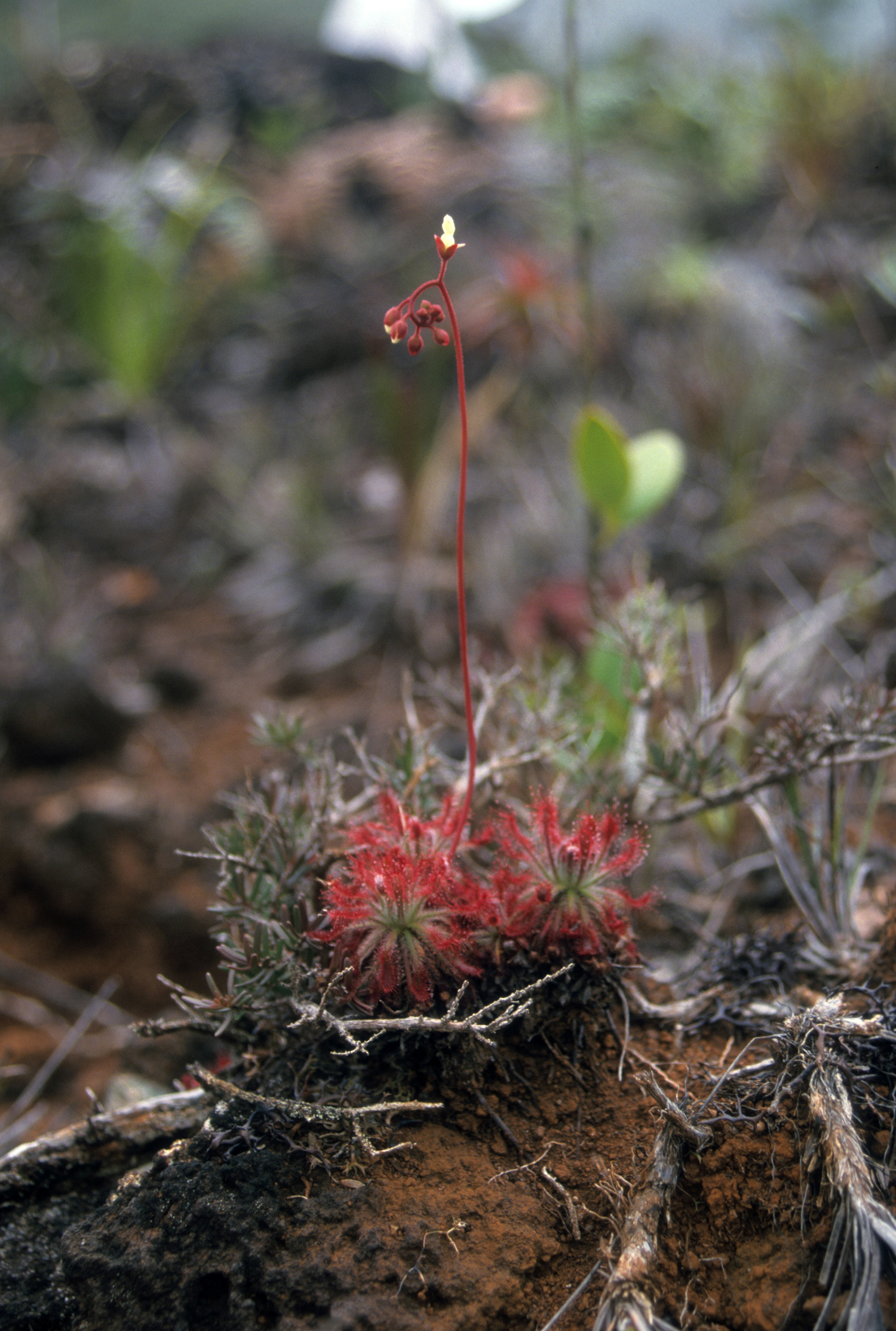
- Drosera neocaledonica on Mont Dzumac, New Caledonia

Conservation status
- Least Concern (IUCN 3.1)

Scientific classification
- Kingdom: Plantae
- Clade: Tracheophytes
- Clade: Angiosperms
- Clade: Eudicots
- Order: Caryophyllales
- Family: Droseraceae
- Genus: Drosera
- Species: D. neocaledonica

Binomial name
- Drosera neocaledonica Raym.-Hamet

= Drosera neocaledonica =

Species of plant

Drosera neocaledonica is a species of carnivorous plant in the family Droseraceae. It is endemic to New Caledonia, where it occurs on Grande Terre, principally on ultramafic substrates. It is a perennial, stem-forming sundew with semi-erect leaves and conspicuous white hairs on the petioles.

== Description ==
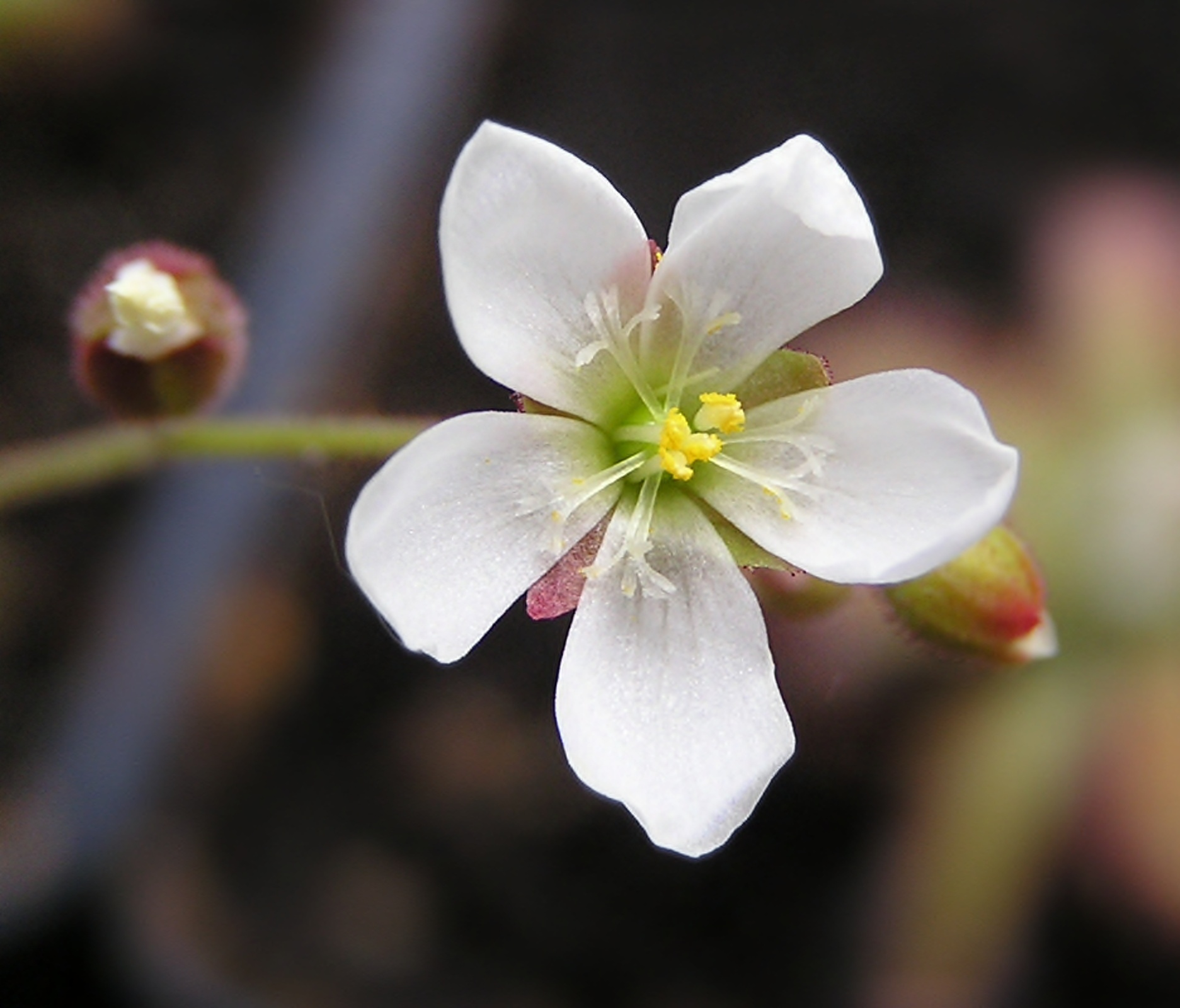
Flower of D. neocaledonica

Drosera neocaledonica forms a stem-bearing rosette with semi-erect leaves. The leaf blades are narrowly spatulate to oblong, while the petioles bear conspicuous bristly white hairs. The flowering scape is hairy near its base and, together with the sepals, is densely covered with short-stalked red glandular trichomes.

The flowers reach about 2 cm (0.79 in) in diameter. The petals are approximately 10 mm (0.39 in) long and 4–5 mm (0.16–0.20 in) wide, and range from cuneate to obovate in shape. The styles are divided at the base and have multiply branched stigmatic tips. The seeds are ellipsoid, apiculate and minutely foveolate.

== Distribution and habitat ==
The species is restricted to New Caledonia. Within Grande Terre it is recorded from the southern massif, from Port-Boisé northwards to Dogny, at elevations of about 50 to 1,280 m (160 to 4,200 ft). It grows mainly in open vegetation, including shrubland and marshes, and more occasionally in forest. Most known occurrences are on ultramafic substrates.

A 2011 study described D. neocaledonica as apparently restricted to ultramafic substrates in the wild. The same study noted, however, that plants can be cultivated in peat-based substrates without the high concentrations of heavy minerals characteristic of ultramafic soils.

== Taxonomy ==
Drosera neocaledonica was formally described by French botanist Raymond-Hamet in 1906 in the Bulletin de la Société Botanique de France. Plants of the World Online accepts the species and lists Drosera caledonica Vieill. ex Diels and the nomen nudum Drosera rubiginosa Heckel as heterotypic synonyms.
