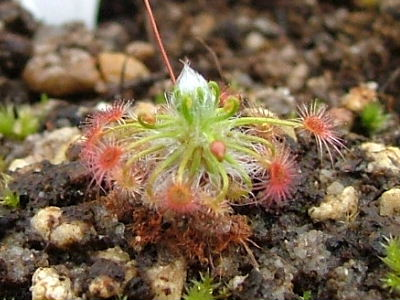

Conservation status
- Vulnerable (IUCN 3.1)

Scientific classification
- Kingdom: Plantae
- Clade: Tracheophytes
- Clade: Angiosperms
- Clade: Eudicots
- Order: Caryophyllales
- Family: Droseraceae
- Genus: Drosera
- Subgenus: Drosera subg. Bryastrum
- Section: Drosera sect. Lamprolepis
- Species: D. pedicellaris

Binomial name
- Drosera pedicellaris Lowrie
- Range of D. pedicellaris in the wild.

= Drosera pedicellaris =

Species of carnivorous plant

Drosera pedicellaris is a pygmy species of the sundew genus (Drosera). It was discovered in 1997 and described in 2002 by Allen Lowrie. It is endemic to Western Australia.

== Description ==
The plant forms a ground-hugging open rosette, 1–1.8 cm (0.39–0.71 in) in diameter. Like all pygmy sundews, it is able to reproduce asexually by producing gemmae in autumn.

=== Leaves ===
The plant has up to twenty active leaves, which are first semi-erect and then, when older, almost horizontal at the rosette's margin. The slightly hairy petioles are 4–5 mm (0.16–0.20 in) long and 0.8 mm (0.031 in) wide at the base and narrowing to 0.1 mm (0.0039 in) width before the lamina. The lamina is suborbicular and has a diameter of about one millimetre.

=== Inflorescence ===
Flowering takes place in October–November when the plant produces one to three cymes with thin bracteoles on filiform inflorescences, rising up to 5.5 cm (2.2 in) high and bearing up to twenty flowers, or even more. These have five white petals with a green section at the base, each up to 3.5 millimetres long. The pollen is orange. The flowers have unusually long pedicels. The ellipsoid seeds are 0.4–0.5 mm (0.016–0.020 in) long.

== Distribution, habitat and status ==
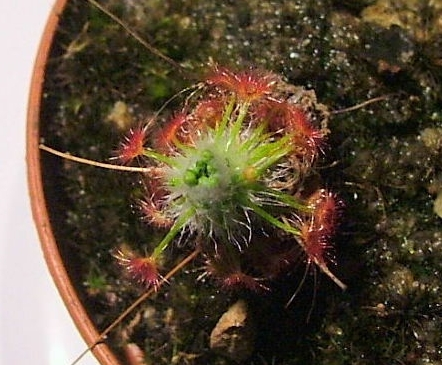
Drosera pedicellaris with gemmae.

Drosera pedicellarisis only known from three small areas, one southeast of Geraldton near Three Springs, one to the east of Geraldton near Pindar, and the third in the northern edge of Badgingarra nature reserve. It appears to be restricted to white sandy soils in open heathland. It occurs at elevations of 80–300 m (260–980 ft) above sea level.

Two of the three sites are nature reserves. In the unprotected areas, agricultural development is a potential risk. Fire is a potential hazard also in protected areas.

== Taxonomy and etymology ==
Drosera pedicellaris is part of the large group of the so-called "pygmy sundews", which form the genus' section Bryastrum. It is closely related to Drosera parvula.

The epithet pedicellaris refers to the plant's distinctly long pedicels.
