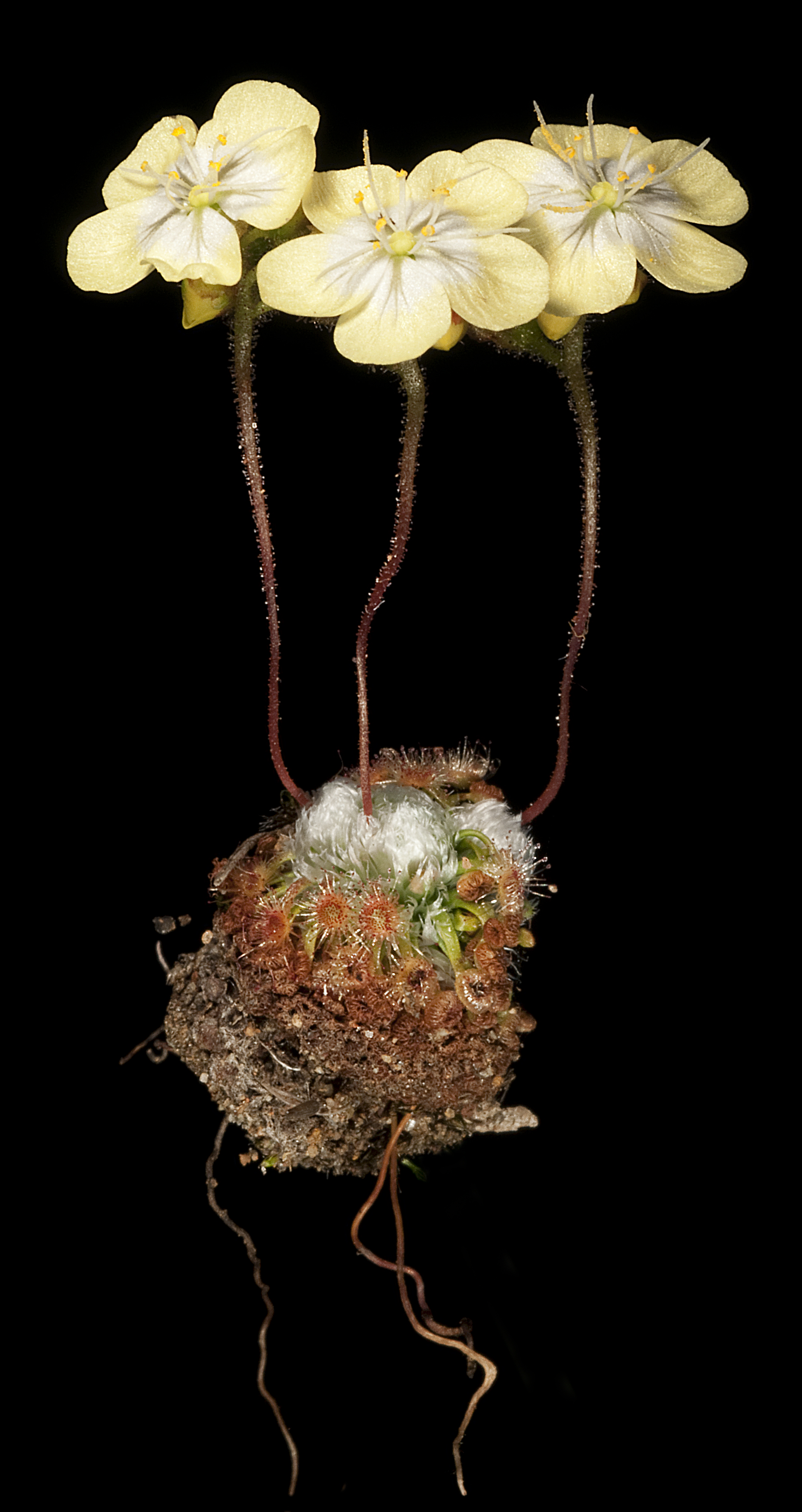

Conservation status
- Least Concern (IUCN 3.1)

Scientific classification
- Kingdom: Plantae
- Clade: Tracheophytes
- Clade: Angiosperms
- Clade: Eudicots
- Order: Caryophyllales
- Family: Droseraceae
- Genus: Drosera
- Subgenus: Drosera subg. Bryastrum
- Section: Drosera sect. Lamprolepis
- Species: D. citrina

Binomial name
- Drosera citrina Lowrie & Carlquist

Synonyms
- Drosera chrysochila; Drosera coalara

= Drosera citrina =

Species of carnivorous plant

Drosera citrina is a species of pygmy sundew in the family Droseraceae. It is a carnivorous plant is native to Western Australia. The Latin specific epithet citrina means "lemon coloured", referring to the colour of the flowers. It is closely related to Drosera nivea, which was considered a variety of D. citrina in the past called Drosera citrina var. nivea.

== Reproduction ==
Drosera citrina can reproduce both sexually and asexually. They produce flowers which are lemon yellow or occasionally white. They also reproduce asexually by producing gemmae (singular gemma) : modified leaves which can grow into a genetically identical individual to the parent plant.

== Uses ==
Drosera citrina is used as an ornamental plant and cultivated by horticulturalists and carnivorous plant enthusiasts.

== See also ==
- List of Drosera species
