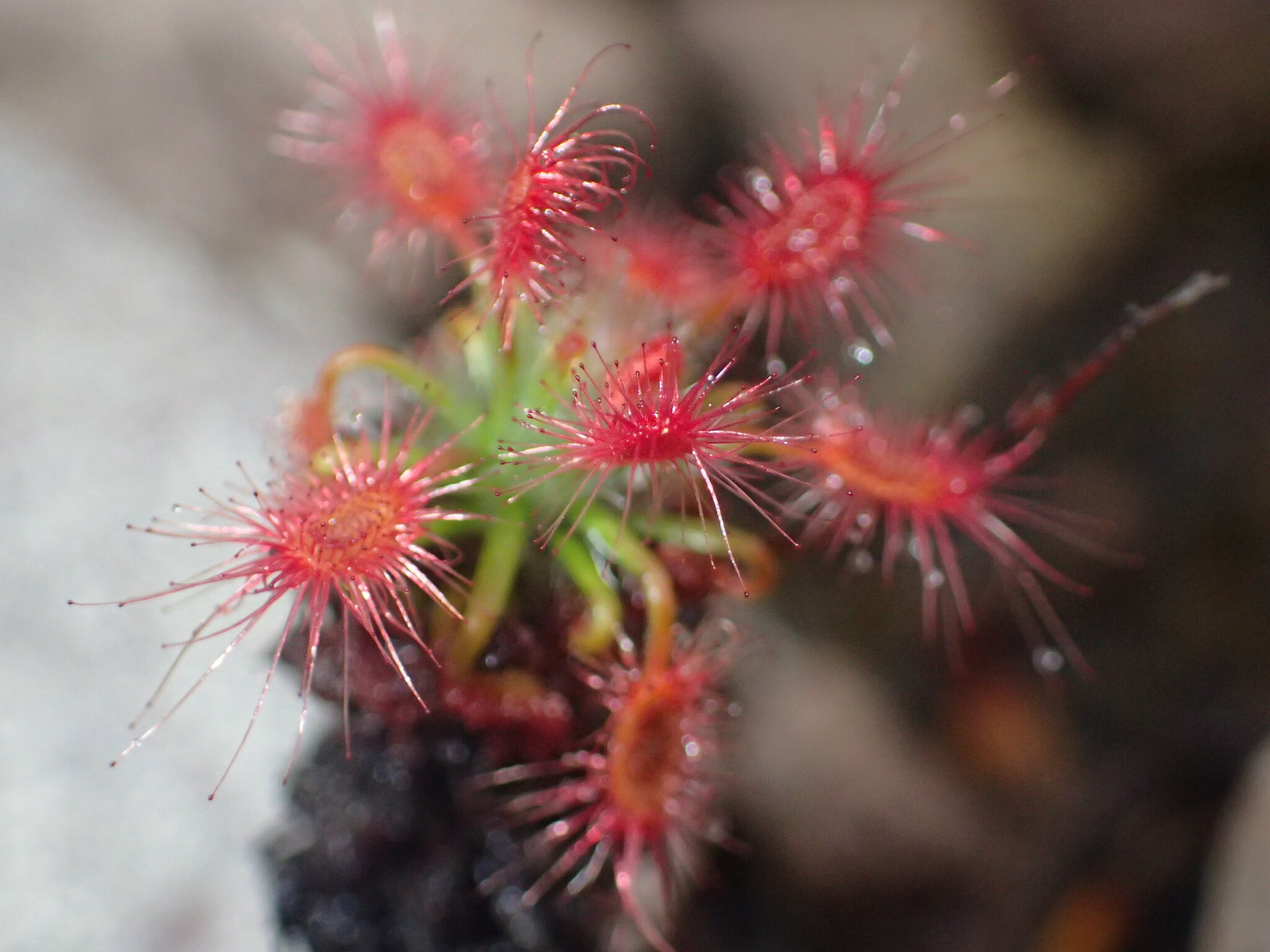

Scientific classification
- Kingdom: Plantae
- Clade: Tracheophytes
- Clade: Angiosperms
- Clade: Eudicots
- Order: Caryophyllales
- Family: Droseraceae
- Genus: Drosera
- Subgenus: Drosera subg. Bryastrum
- Section: Drosera sect. Lamprolepis
- Species: D. gibsonii

Binomial name
- Drosera gibsonii P.Mann (2007)
- Wild range (in red)

= Drosera gibsonii =

Species of carnivorous plant

Drosera gibsonii is a species of pygmy sundew endemic to Stirling Range National Park in Western Australia. It is thought to be most closely related to Drosera silvicola.
