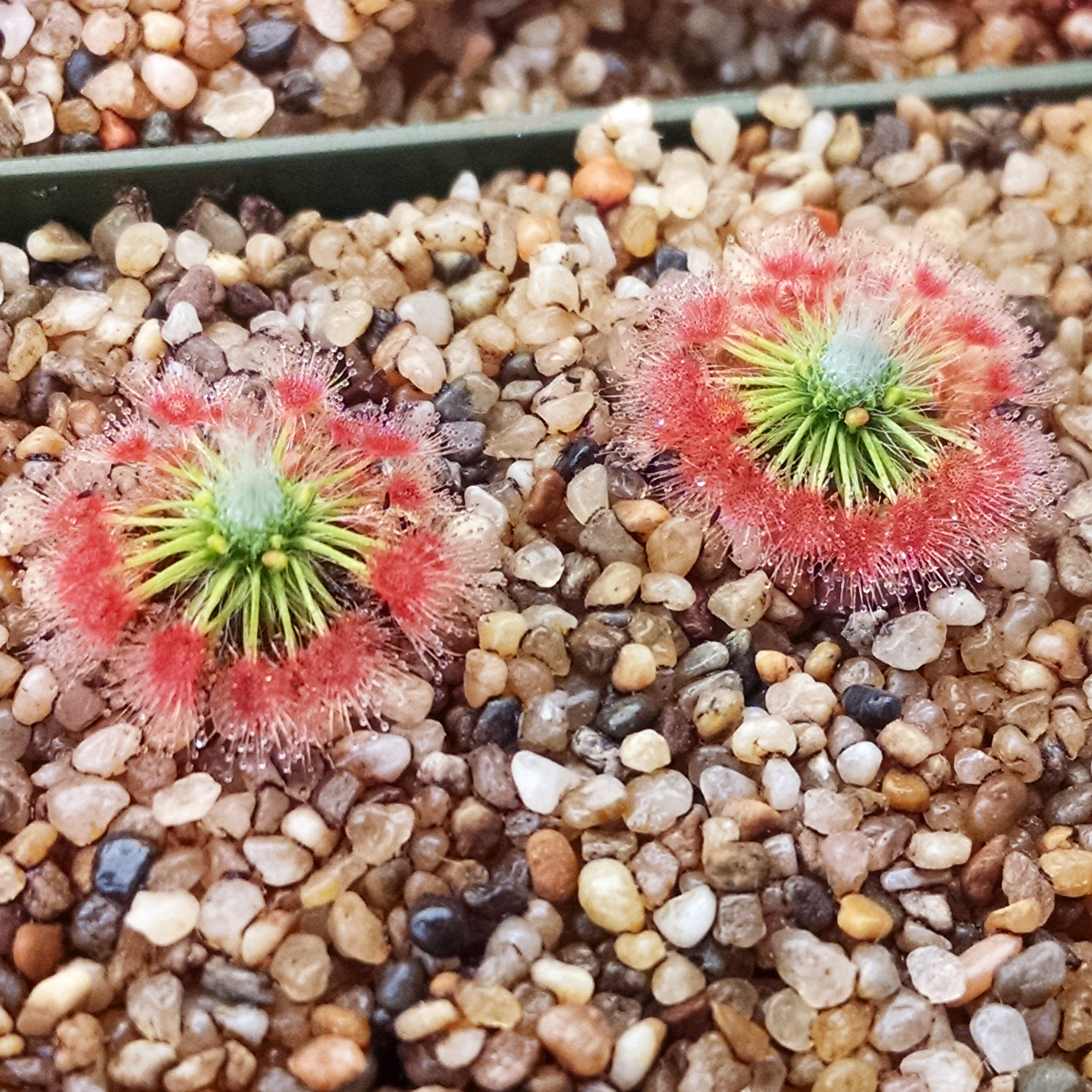

Scientific classification
- Kingdom: Plantae
- Clade: Tracheophytes
- Clade: Angiosperms
- Clade: Eudicots
- Order: Caryophyllales
- Family: Droseraceae
- Genus: Drosera
- Subgenus: Drosera subg. Bryastrum
- Section: Drosera sect. Lamprolepis
- Species: D. sargentii

Binomial name
- Drosera sargentii Lowrie & N.G.Marchant

= Drosera sargentii =

Species of carnivorous plant

Drosera sargentii is a species of pygmy sundew from Western Australia.

Range of D. sargentii in the wild.
