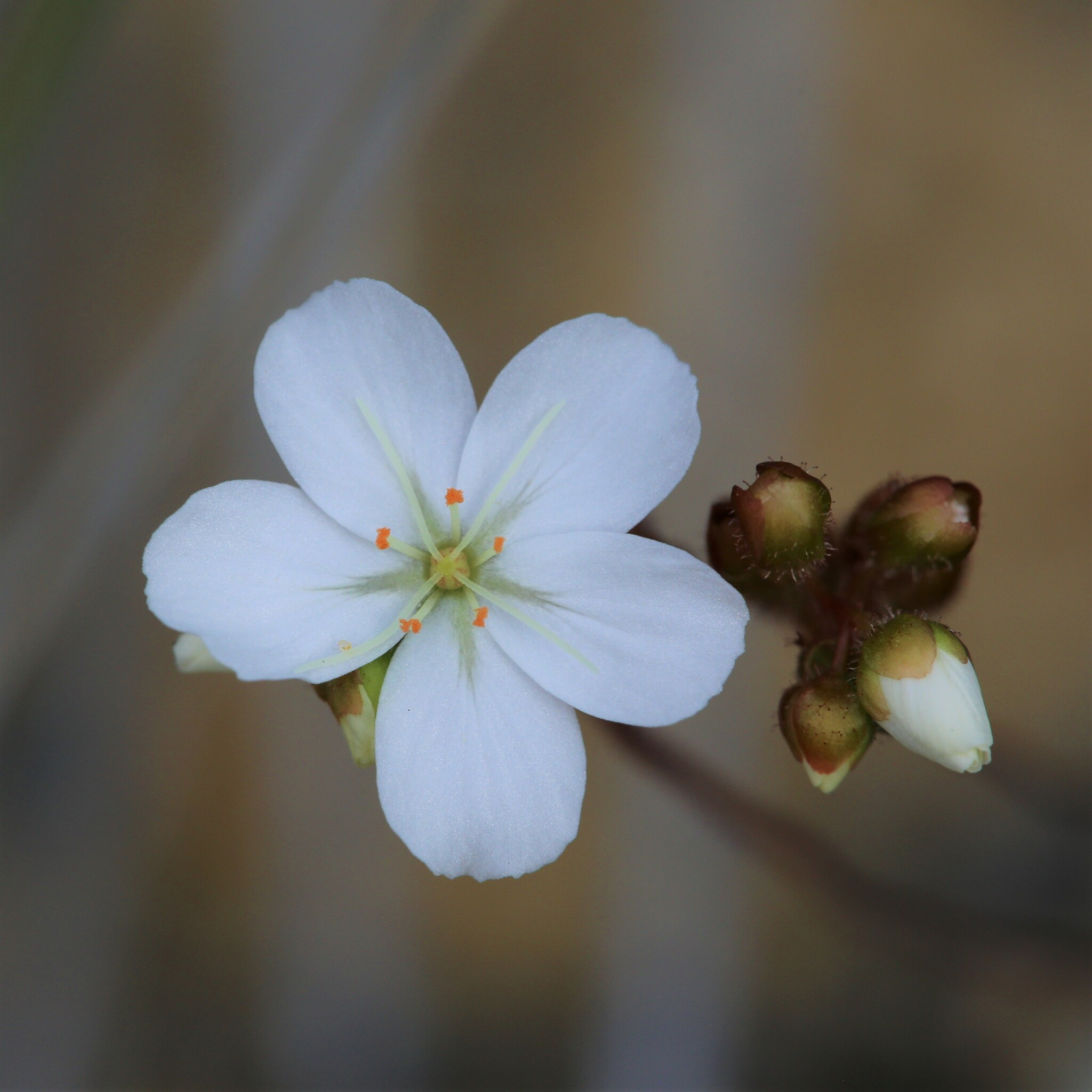

Conservation status
- Vulnerable (IUCN 3.1)

Scientific classification
- Kingdom: Plantae
- Clade: Tracheophytes
- Clade: Angiosperms
- Clade: Eudicots
- Order: Caryophyllales
- Family: Droseraceae
- Genus: Drosera
- Subgenus: Drosera subg. Bryastrum
- Section: Drosera sect. Lamprolepis
- Species: D. nivea

Binomial name
- Drosera nivea Lowrie & Carlquist

Synonyms
- D.citrina var. nivea

= Drosera nivea =

Species of carnivorous plant

Drosera nivea is a species of carnivorous plant. It is a pygmy sundew and is native to Western Australia. The specific epithet nivea is derived from the Latin word niveus, meaning white, in reference to the colour of the plant's flower. It is closely related to Drosera citrina and has previously been considered a variety of D.citrina known as D. citrina var. nivea.

== See also ==
- List of Drosera species
- Drosera citrina
