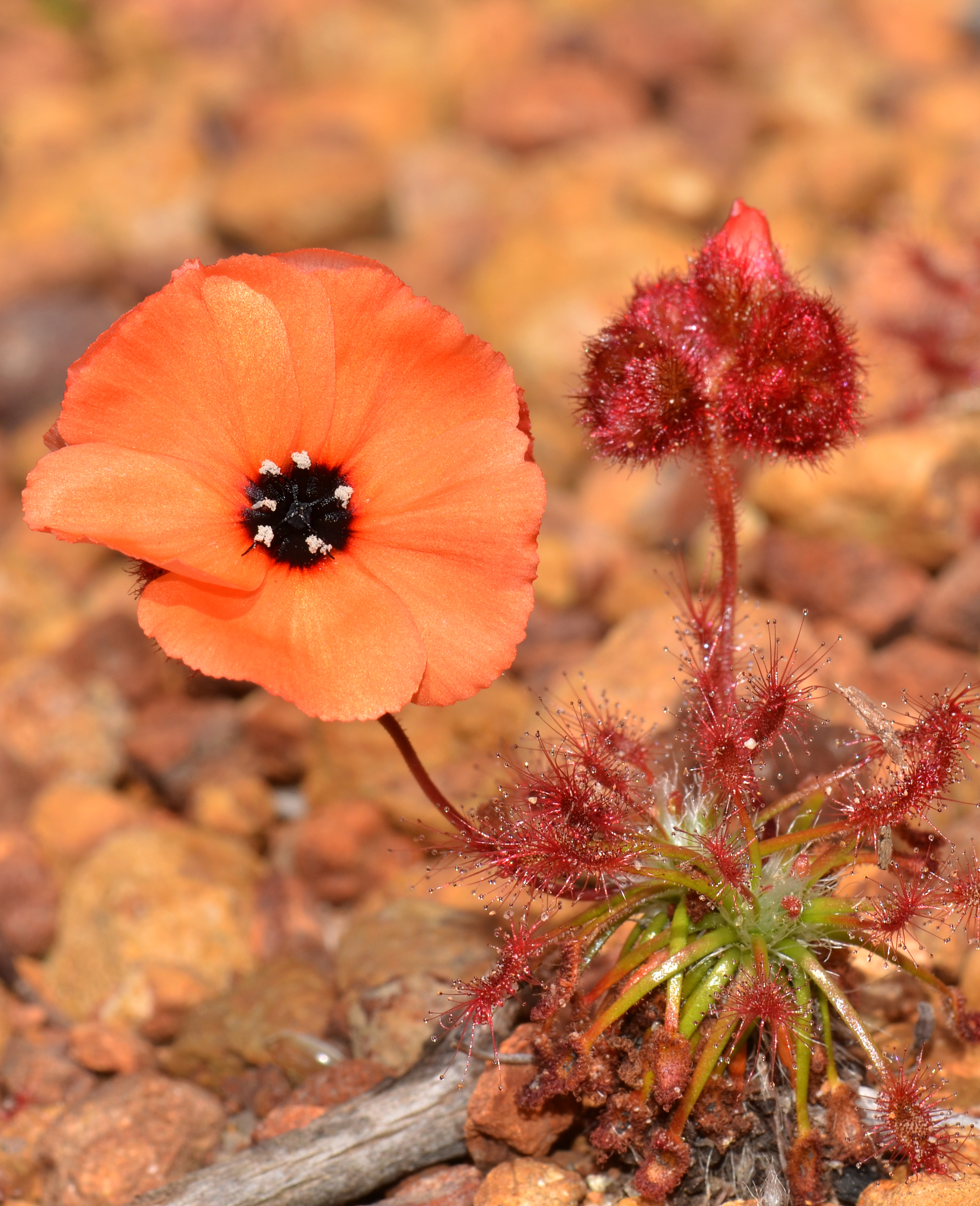

Scientific classification
- Kingdom: Plantae
- Clade: Tracheophytes
- Clade: Angiosperms
- Clade: Eudicots
- Order: Caryophyllales
- Family: Droseraceae
- Genus: Drosera
- Subgenus: Drosera subg. Bryastrum
- Section: Drosera sect. Lamprolepis
- Species: D. barbigera

Binomial name
- Drosera barbigera Planch.
- Drosera barbigera native distribution

= Drosera barbigera =

Species of carnivorous plant

Drosera barbigera is a species of pygmy sundew from Western Australia. The specific epithet "barbigera" is derived from Latin and means "bearded" (barbiger = bearded).
