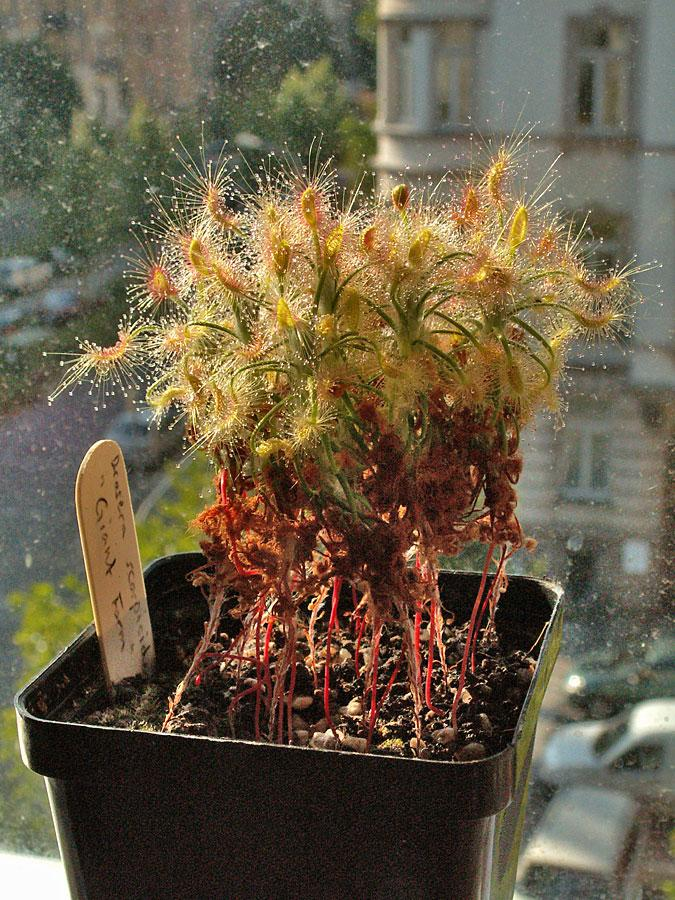
- Drosera scorpioides 'Giant'

Scientific classification
- Kingdom: Plantae
- Clade: Tracheophytes
- Clade: Angiosperms
- Clade: Eudicots
- Order: Caryophyllales
- Family: Droseraceae
- Genus: Drosera
- Subgenus: Drosera subg. Bryastrum
- Section: Drosera sect. Lamprolepis
- Species: D. scorpioides

Binomial name
- Drosera scorpioides Planch.

= Drosera scorpioides =

Species of carnivorous plant

Drosera scorpioides, commonly called the shaggy sundew, is a pygmy sundew native to the Jarrah Forest region and southern coasts of Southwest Australia. Notable for its unusually large size relative to other pygmy sundews, D. scorpioides can produce rosettes measuring up to two inches in diameter and specimens may attain a height of up to 100 millimeters (approximately 3.9 inches). The species is found on white sand and clay, near swamps, on sand ridges, and is associated with laterite. The flowers are pink and white, appearing sometime between August and October. Depending on the form, D. scorpioides can be expected to live up to seven years.

Range of D. scorpioides in the wild.

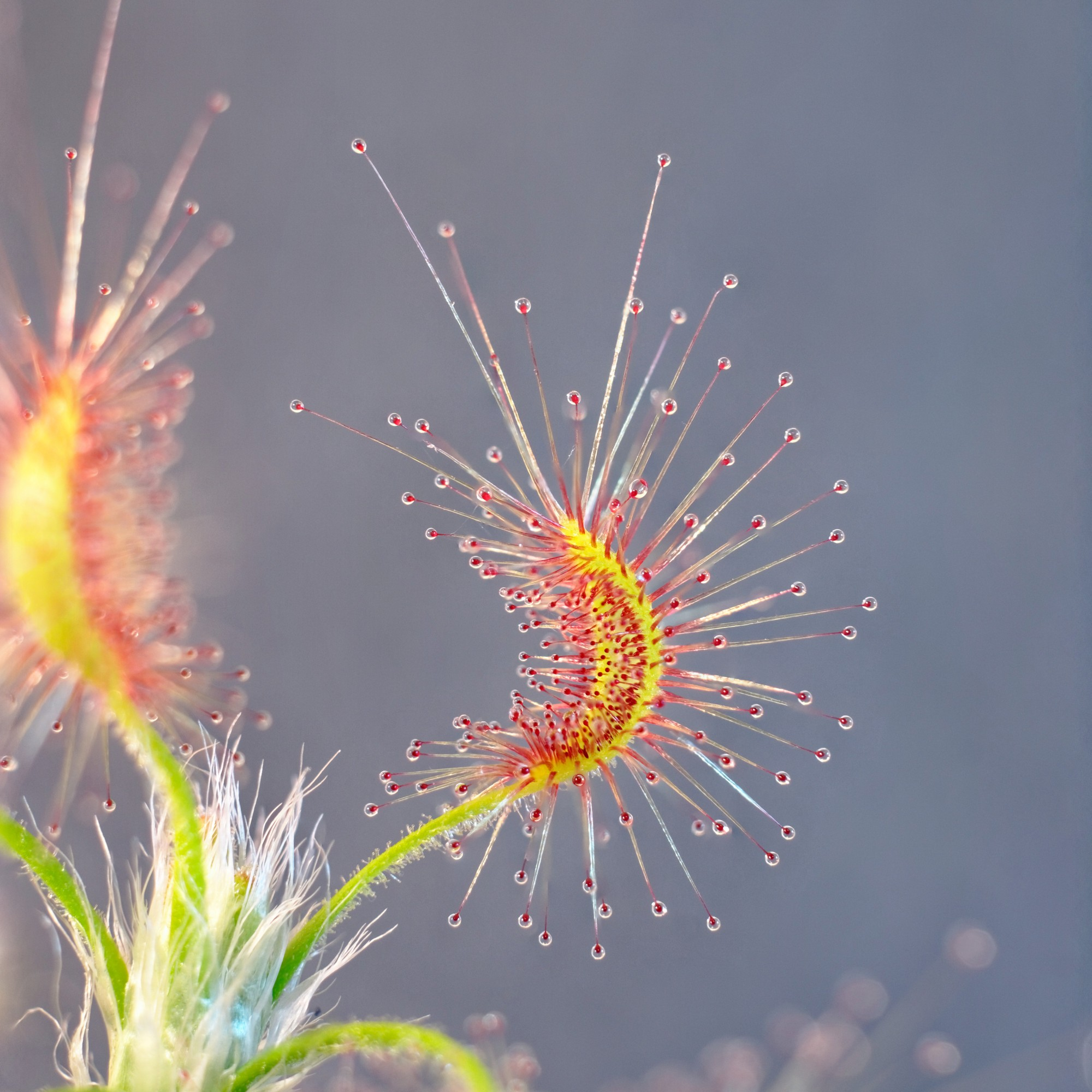
Closeup of a single leaf.

== See also ==
- List of Drosera species
