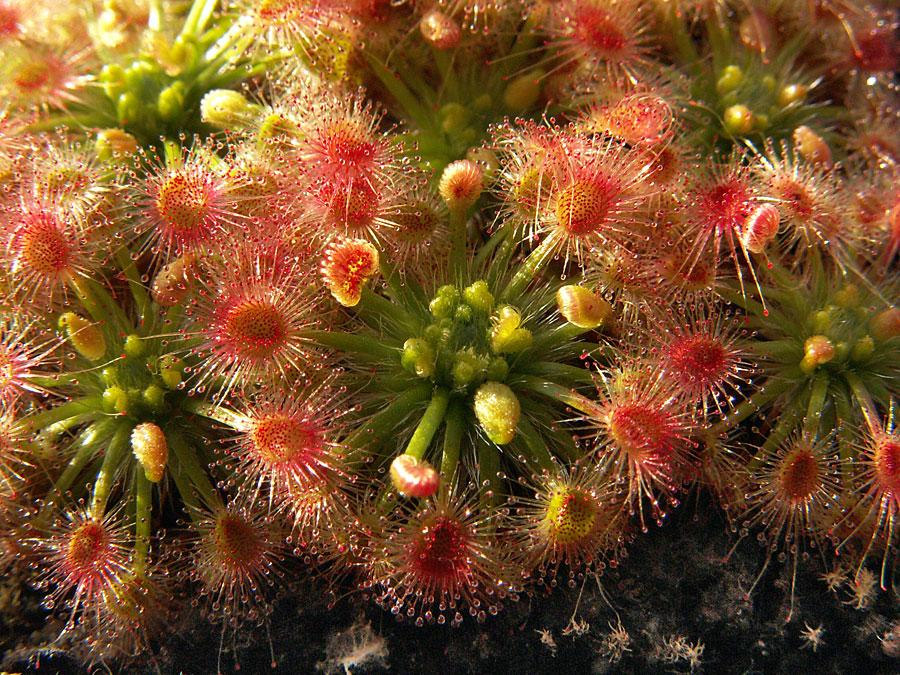

Conservation status
- Least Concern (IUCN 3.1)

Scientific classification
- Kingdom: Plantae
- Clade: Tracheophytes
- Clade: Angiosperms
- Clade: Eudicots
- Order: Caryophyllales
- Family: Droseraceae
- Genus: Drosera
- Subgenus: Drosera subg. Bryastrum
- Section: Drosera sect. Lamprolepis
- Species: D. callistos

Binomial name
- Drosera callistos N. G. Marchant & Lowrie

= Drosera callistos =

Species of carnivorous plant

Drosera callistos is a species of pygmy sundew from Western Australia. The specific epithet callistos is from the Greek word callistos meaning beautiful.

Range of D. callistos in the wild.
