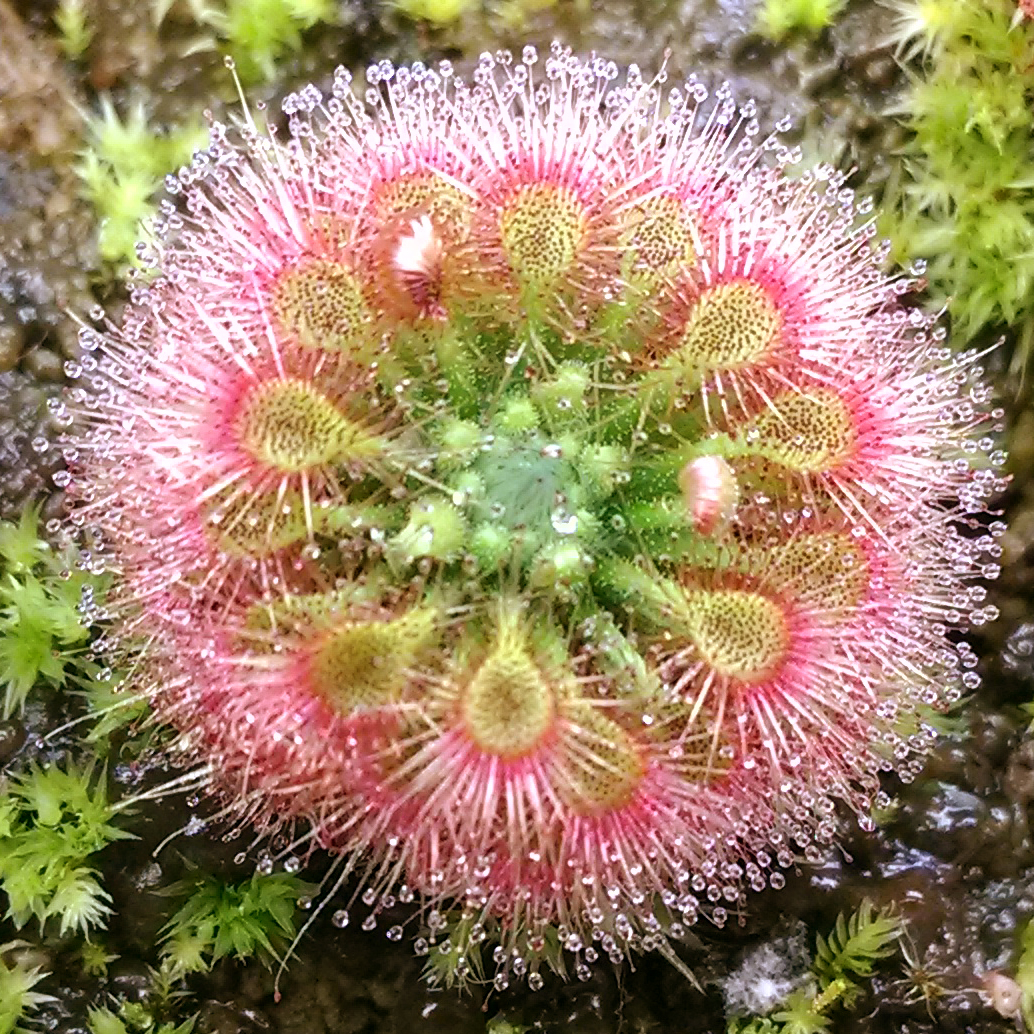

Conservation status
- Critically endangered, possibly extinct (IUCN 3.1)

Scientific classification
- Kingdom: Plantae
- Clade: Tracheophytes
- Clade: Angiosperms
- Clade: Eudicots
- Order: Caryophyllales
- Family: Droseraceae
- Genus: Drosera
- Subgenus: Drosera subg. Bryastrum
- Section: Drosera sect. Lamprolepis
- Species: D. allantostigma

Binomial name
- Drosera allantostigma N.Marchant & Lowrie

= Drosera allantostigma =

Species of carnivorous plant

Drosera allantostigma is a species of pygmy sundew from Australia. The specific epithet "allantostigma" is derived from Latin and means "sausage-shaped stigma" (allantoideus = sausage-shaped; stigma = the receptive surface on the style that pollen germinates on).

Range of D. allantostigma in the wild.
