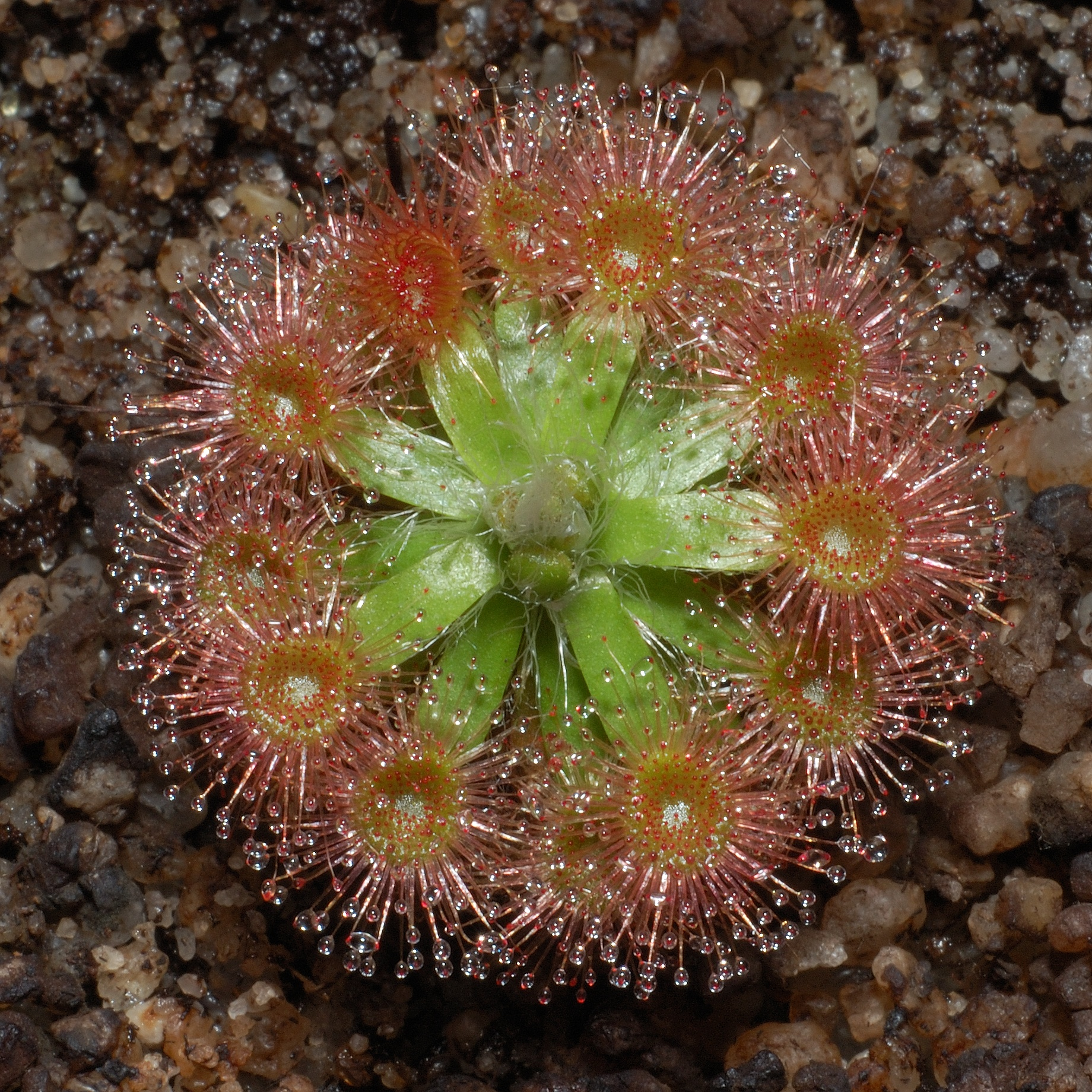
- Pygmy sundew

Conservation status
- Least Concern (IUCN 3.1)

Scientific classification
- Kingdom: Plantae
- Clade: Tracheophytes
- Clade: Angiosperms
- Clade: Eudicots
- Order: Caryophyllales
- Family: Droseraceae
- Genus: Drosera
- Subgenus: Drosera subg. Bryastrum
- Section: Drosera sect. Lamprolepis
- Species: D. pulchella

Binomial name
- Drosera pulchella Lehm.

= Drosera pulchella =

Species of carnivorous plant

Drosera pulchella is a species of carnivorous plant in the family Droseraceae. This species of pygmy sundew (subgenus Bryastrum) is native to southwestern Australia. As their common name suggests, they are a small species that are usually 15 to 20 millimeters wide. They typically grow in clusters that completely cover an area like a patch of moss. The namesake sticky dew at the ends of their leaves is designed to trap insects so that the plants can absorb nutrients as the insect decomposes.

== Distribution ==
Drosera pulchella is found in Western Australia where there is a moderate Mediterranean climate. It is one of many species of Drosera that can be found there. There are about 50 species of pygmy sundews distributed mostly throughout Australia, Tasmania and New Zealand.

== Habitat and ecology ==
This species can typically be found in areas with abundant year-round moisture such as swamps, creeks, lakes and forests.

Unusual among sundews, these plants have to be able to cope with the Australian dry season, so they have developed extensive roots so that they can obtain water when it becomes scarce. They also have to compensate for the poor quality of the soil they live in, which is the main theory why they evolved to catch insects.

== Morphology ==
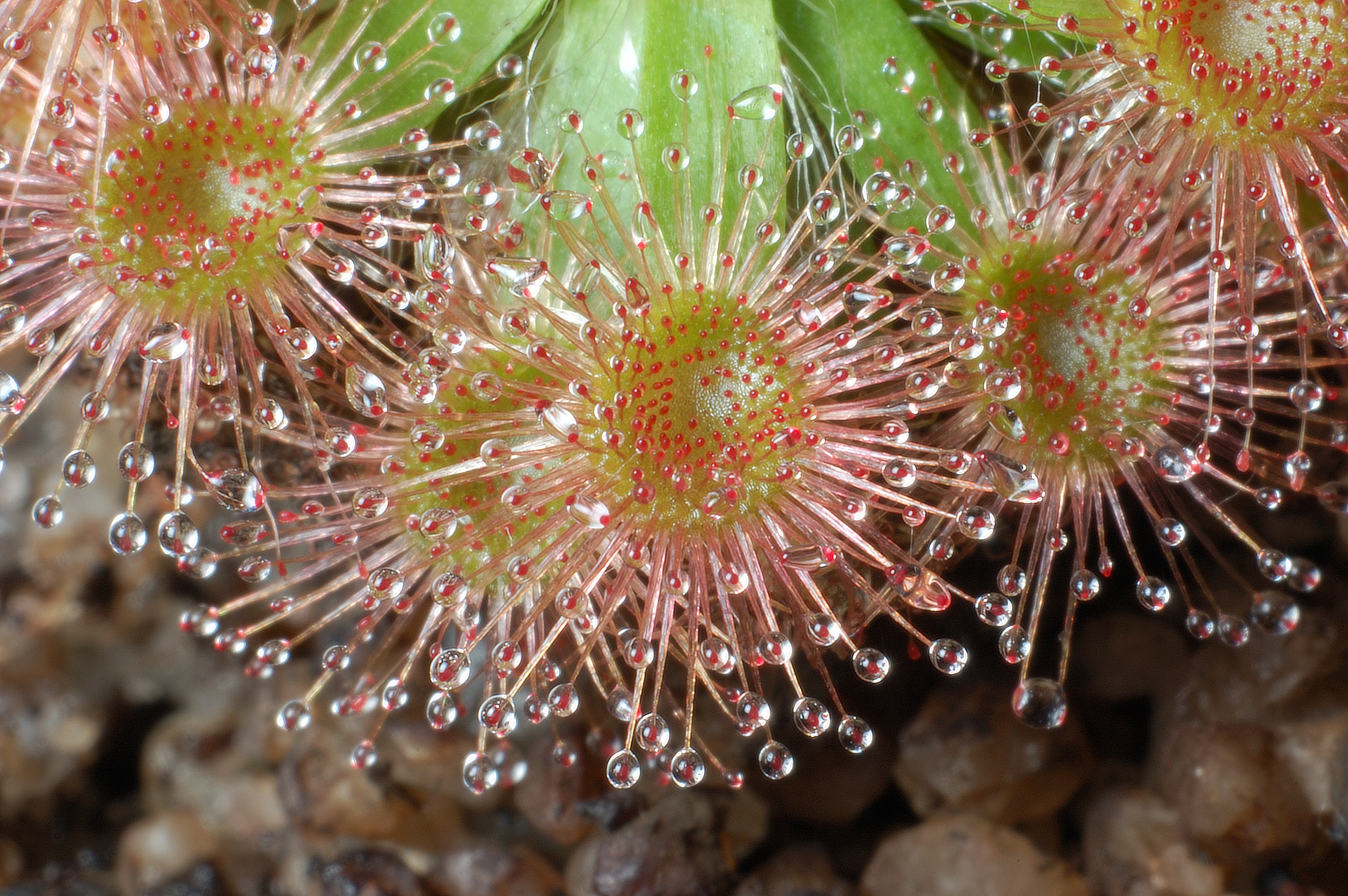
Tentacles of Drosera pulchella

The plant itself is low to the ground with its leaves surrounding a central bud. On the ends of the leaves are tentacle-like projections that produce the sticky mucus-like substance that the plant uses to trap insects.

The plant lures insects in by producing a sweet-smelling secretion that draws them close to the tentacles. Once the insect is caught the tentacles contract to engulf and cover it with sticky mucus. Once caught in the trap, the insect either dies of exhaustion or suffocation as the sticky mucus clogs their spiracles.

== Reproduction ==
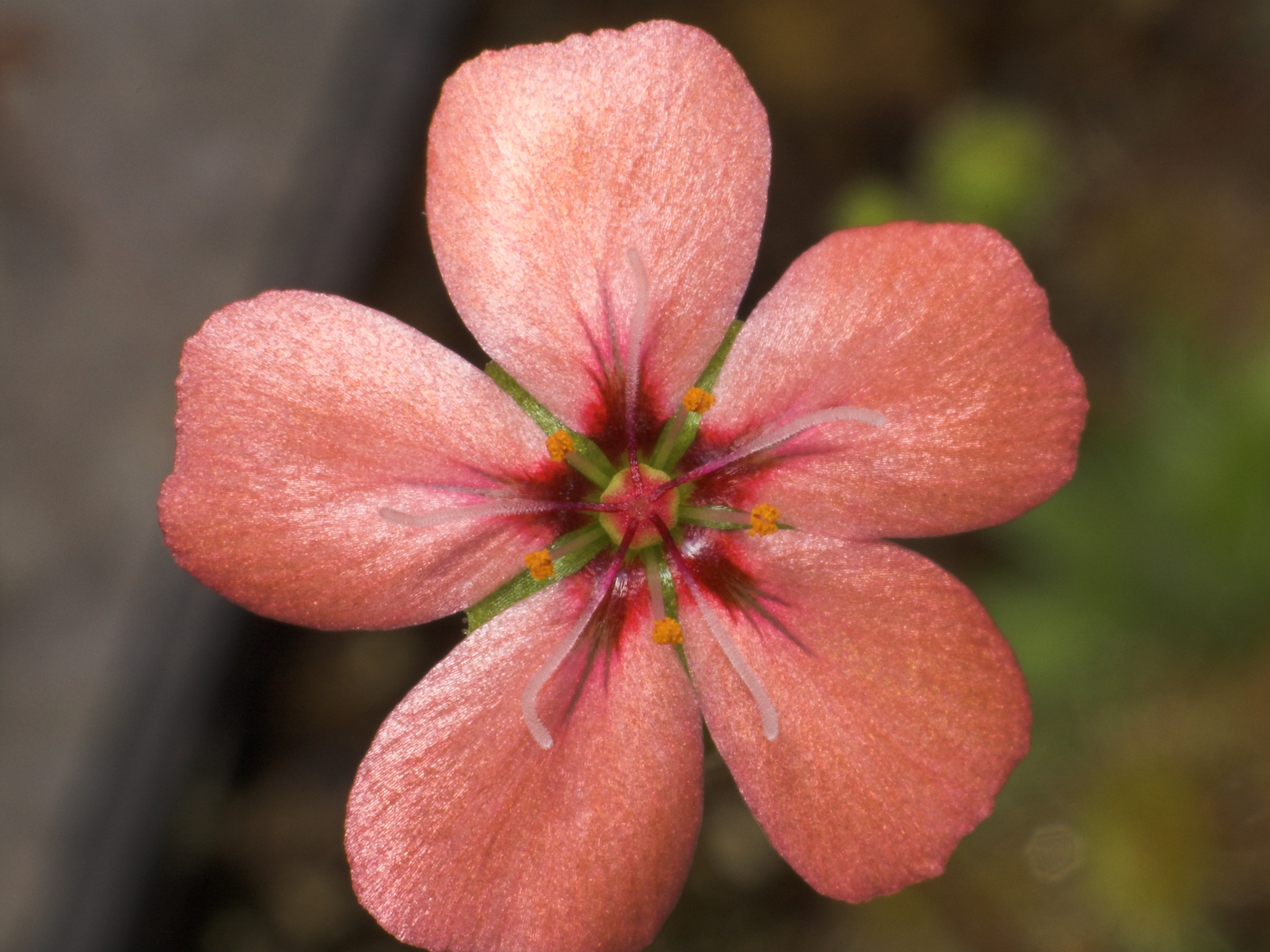
Drosera pulchella flower

Drosera pulchella can reproduce sexually and asexually depending on the conditions in its environment. Pygmy Drosera can flower at will and usually produce white, pink, yellow, orange or red flowers. While they do produce flowers they are not very efficient at producing seeds and therefore only flower when conditions are best. Most of the time they reproduce asexually by producing gemmae. The gemmae is a specialized leaf that detaches and becomes a new plant, genetically identical to the parent plant. The plant makes dozens of gemmae, so many that it pushes the leaves away from the rosette at the center creating tension. This allows the gemmae to be launched up to several meters when the plant is touched.

== Uses ==
These tiny plants are primarily used for terrariums and indoor plants where they can be maintained and grown in stable environments.
