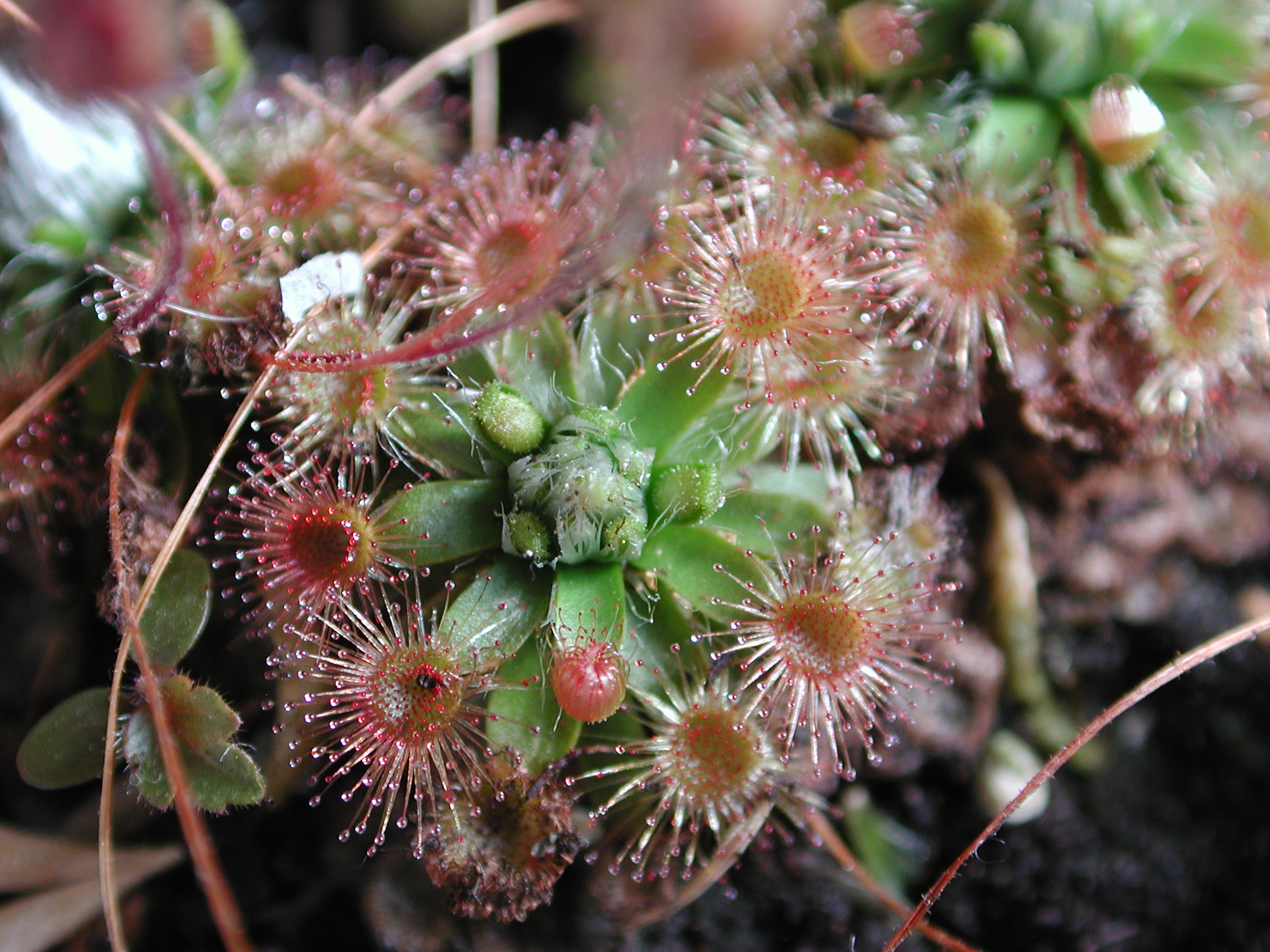
- Drosera pulchella

Scientific classification
- Kingdom: Plantae
- Clade: Tracheophytes
- Clade: Angiosperms
- Clade: Eudicots
- Order: Caryophyllales
- Family: Droseraceae
- Genus: Drosera
- Subgenus: Drosera subg. Bryastrum
- Section: Drosera sect. Lamprolepis; Planch.

Species
- See text

= Drosera sect. Lamprolepis =

Section of carnivorous plants

Drosera sect. Lamprolepis is a section of multiple species in the genus Drosera that are known as pygmy sundews.

== Description and distribution ==
Image	Scientific name	Distribution
	Drosera allantostigma N.Marchant & Lowrie	Australia.
	Drosera androsacea Diels	Western Australia.
	Drosera barbigera Planch.	Western Australia.
	Drosera callistos N. G. Marchant & Lowrie	Western Australia.
	Drosera citrina Lowrie & Carlquist	Western Australia.
	Drosera closterostigma N. Marchant & Lowrie	Western Australia.
	Drosera dichrosepala Turcz.	Western Australia.
	Drosera echinoblastus Marchant & Lowrie	Western Australia.
	Drosera eneabba N.G.Marchant & Lowrie	Western Australia.
	Drosera enodes N.G.Marchant & Lowrie	Western Australia.
	Drosera gibsonii P.Mann	Western Australia.
	Drosera grievei Lowrie & N.G. Marchant	Western Australia.
	Drosera helodes Marchant & Lowrie	Western Australia.
	Drosera hyperostigma N.G. Marchant & Lowrie	Western Australia.
	Drosera lasiantha Lowrie & Carlquist	Western Australia.
	Drosera leucoblasta Benth.	Western Australia.
	Drosera leucostigma (N.G. Marchant & Lowrie) Lowrie & Conran	Western Australia.
	Drosera mannii Cheek	Western Australia.
	Drosera microscapa Debbert	Western Australia.
	Drosera miniata Diels	Western Australia.
	Drosera nitidula Planch.	Western Australia.
	Drosera nivea Lowrie & Carlquist	Western Australia.
	Drosera occidentalis Morrison	Western Australia.
	Drosera omissa Diels	Western Australia.
	Drosera oreopodion N.G.Marchant & Lowrie	Western Australia.
	Drosera paleacea DC.	Western Australia.
	Drosera patens Lowrie & Conran	Western Australia.
	Drosera pedicellaris Lowrie	Western Australia.
	Drosera platystigma Lehm.	Western Australia.
	Drosera pulchella Lehm.	Western Australia.
	Drosera pycnoblasta Diels	Western Australia.
	Drosera rechingeri Strid	Western Australia.
	Drosera roseana Marchant & Lowrie	Western Australia.
	Drosera sargentii Lowrie & N.G.Marchant	Western Australia.
	Drosera scorpioides Planch.	Southwest Australia.
	Drosera sewelliae Diels	Western Australia.
	Drosera silvicola Lowrie & Carlquist	Western Australia.
	Drosera spilos N.G.Marchant & Lowrie	Western Australia.
	Drosera stelliflora Lowrie & Carlquist	Western Australia.
	Drosera trichocaulis (Diels) Lowrie & Conran	Western Australia.
	Drosera walyunga Marchant & Lowrie	Western Australia.

== See also ==
- List of Drosera species
