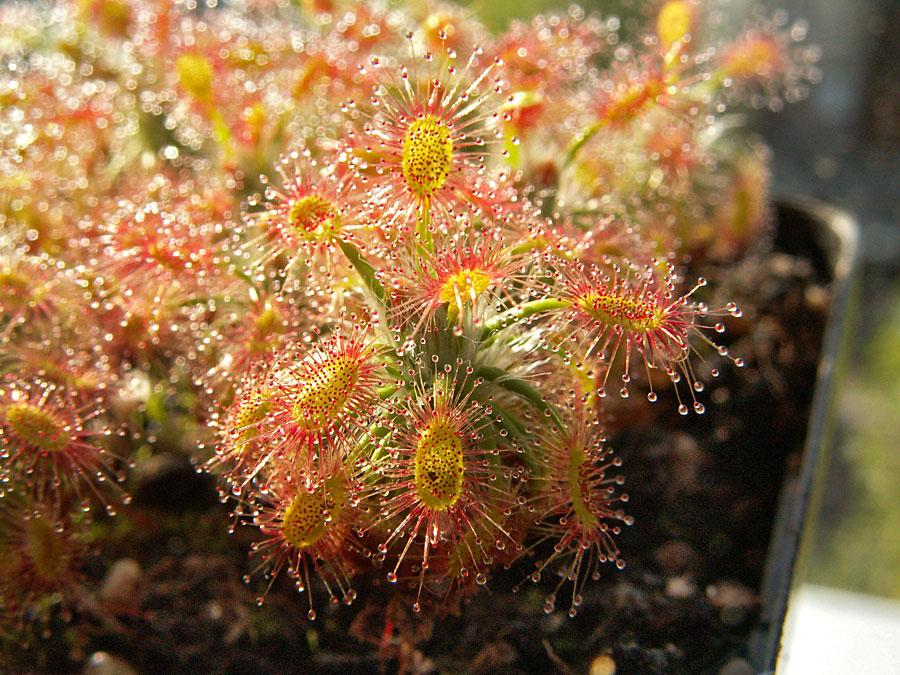

Conservation status
- Endangered (IUCN 3.1)

Scientific classification
- Kingdom: Plantae
- Clade: Tracheophytes
- Clade: Angiosperms
- Clade: Eudicots
- Order: Caryophyllales
- Family: Droseraceae
- Genus: Drosera
- Subgenus: Drosera subg. Bryastrum
- Section: Drosera sect. Lamprolepis
- Species: D. dichrosepala

Binomial name
- Drosera dichrosepala Turcz.

Synonyms
- Drosera scorpioides var. brevipes

= Drosera dichrosepala =

Rusty sundew

Species of carnivorous plant

Drosera dichrosepala, commonly known as the rusty sundew, is a pygmy sundew from Western Australia. It is a carnivorous plant. The specific epithet dichrosepala is a combination of the Greek words dis, meaning double, and chroia, meaning colour, as well as the Latin sepalum meaning sepal, it refers to the plant's sepals being bi-coloured. It has two subspecies: D. dichrosepala ssp.dichrosepala and D. dichrosepala ssp. enodes.

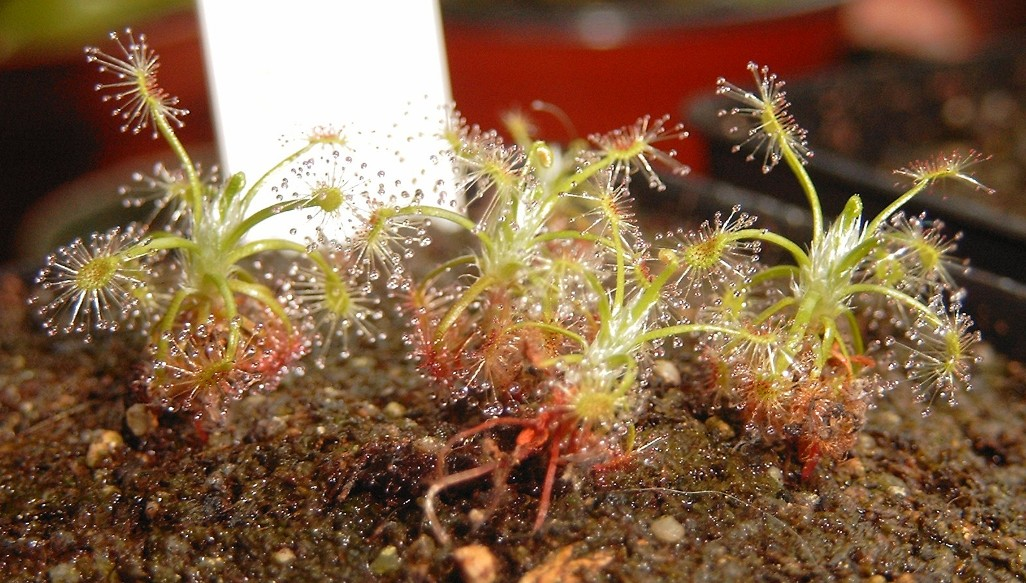
Drosera dichrosepala subsp. enodes
