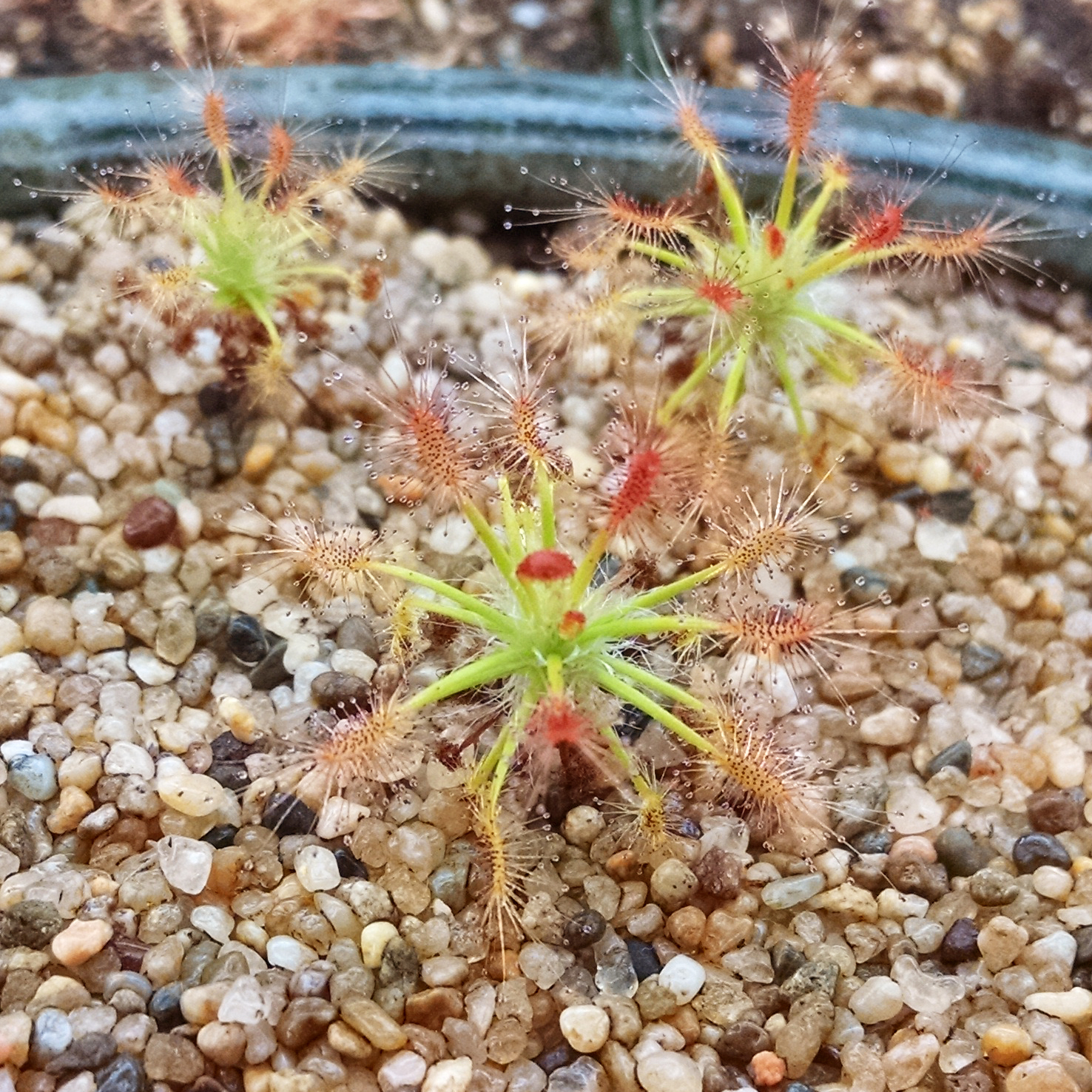

Scientific classification
- Kingdom: Plantae
- Clade: Tracheophytes
- Clade: Angiosperms
- Clade: Eudicots
- Order: Caryophyllales
- Family: Droseraceae
- Genus: Drosera
- Subgenus: Drosera subg. Bryastrum
- Section: Drosera sect. Lamprolepis
- Species: D. silvicola

Binomial name
- Drosera silvicola Lowrie & Carlquist

= Drosera silvicola =

Species of carnivorous plant

Drosera silvicola is a species of pygmy sundew from Western Australia. The specific epithet "silvicola" is derived from Latin, meaning "living in the forest" ("silva" = forest), referring to the location of its habitat.

According to Thilo Krueger, a carnivorous plant expert from Curtin University:

"Drosera silvicola is a very distinctive species of sundew because of its beautiful, absolutely stunning flowers with pink, glossy petals and a dark red centre. It captures and digests tiny insects using its leaves which are covered with sticky tentacles."

The species is listed by the Department of Biodiversity, Conservation and Attractions (DBCA) of Western Australia as a Priority 1 species, ie "extremely rare and potentially threatened, urgently requiring a full conservation assessment".

Range of D. silvicola in the wild.

In late 2025, a team of 10 scientists and volunteers, including Kruger and other experts from Curtin University and the Australian Wildlife Conservancy (AWC), uncovered a large patch of thousands of examples of the species growing in the AWC's Paruna Wildlife Sanctuary, along the Avon River a short distance east of Perth. The species had not been spotted in the area for more than 30 years.

Kruger told 9News, "The area had ridges and slopes that sat high up ... It was in the Jarrah forest, but it was an open area with very little leaf litter – the perfect environment for the species."

Prior to the 2025 discovery, there were only two confirmed populations of the species at other sites, 70 km (43 mi) from the Paruna site, one on a mining tenement and the other on an active mine site.
