= Gemma (botany) =

Asexual reproductive structure

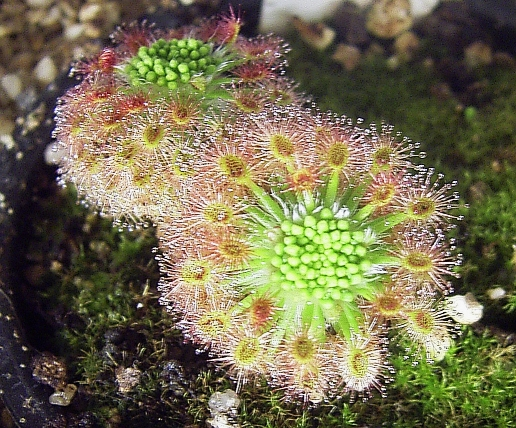
Pygmy sundew Drosera roseana with gemmae.

A gemma (plural gemmae) is a single cell, or a mass of cells, or a modified bud of tissue, that detaches from the parent and develops into a new individual. This type of asexual reproduction is called fragmentation. Gemmae are commonly found in fungi, algae, liverworts and mosses, and in a few flowering plants such as pygmy sundews and some butterworts.

== In mosses and liverworts ==
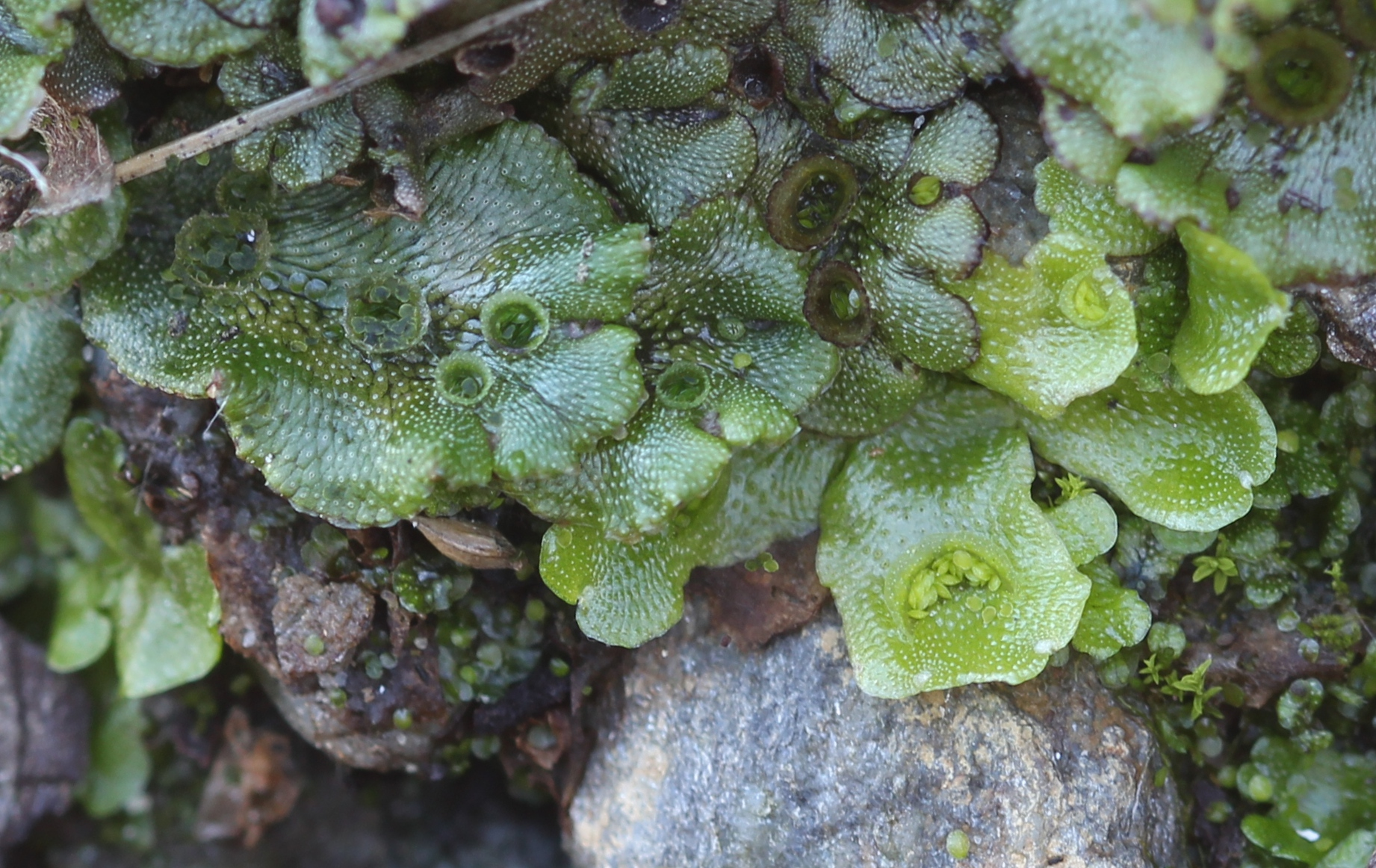
Liverworts Marchantia with round cups, and Lunularia with crescent cups, both containing gemmae. Gemmae dislodged by rain are visible at the bottom of the image.

The production of gemmae is a widespread means of asexual reproduction in both liverworts and mosses. In some species the gemmae are unicellular. In liverworts such as Marchantia, the flattened plant body or thallus has gemma cups scattered about its upper surface. The gemma cups are cup-like structures containing gemmae. The gemmae are small discs of haploid tissue, and they directly give rise to new gametophytes. They are dispersed from gemma cups by rainfall.

The gemmae are bilaterally symmetrical and are not differentiated into dorsal and ventral surfaces. The mature gemmae fall on the ground, and if conditions are suitable their germination starts immediately. The surface of the gemma which comes in contact of the soil gives out many rhizoids. This surface eventually becomes the lower (ventral) surface of the thallus. Meanwhile, the apical cells present in the two lateral notches become active and form two thalli in opposite directions.

Endogenous gemmae are also produced in liverworts, these are ovoid or ellipsoidal shaped, 2 celled at leaf tips or margins. Examples of this include Bazzania kokawana (Fossombroniaceae), Endogemma caespiticia and also species in the genus Riccardia.
