= Paul Pfurtscheller =

Austrian zoologist and natural history artist (1855–1927)

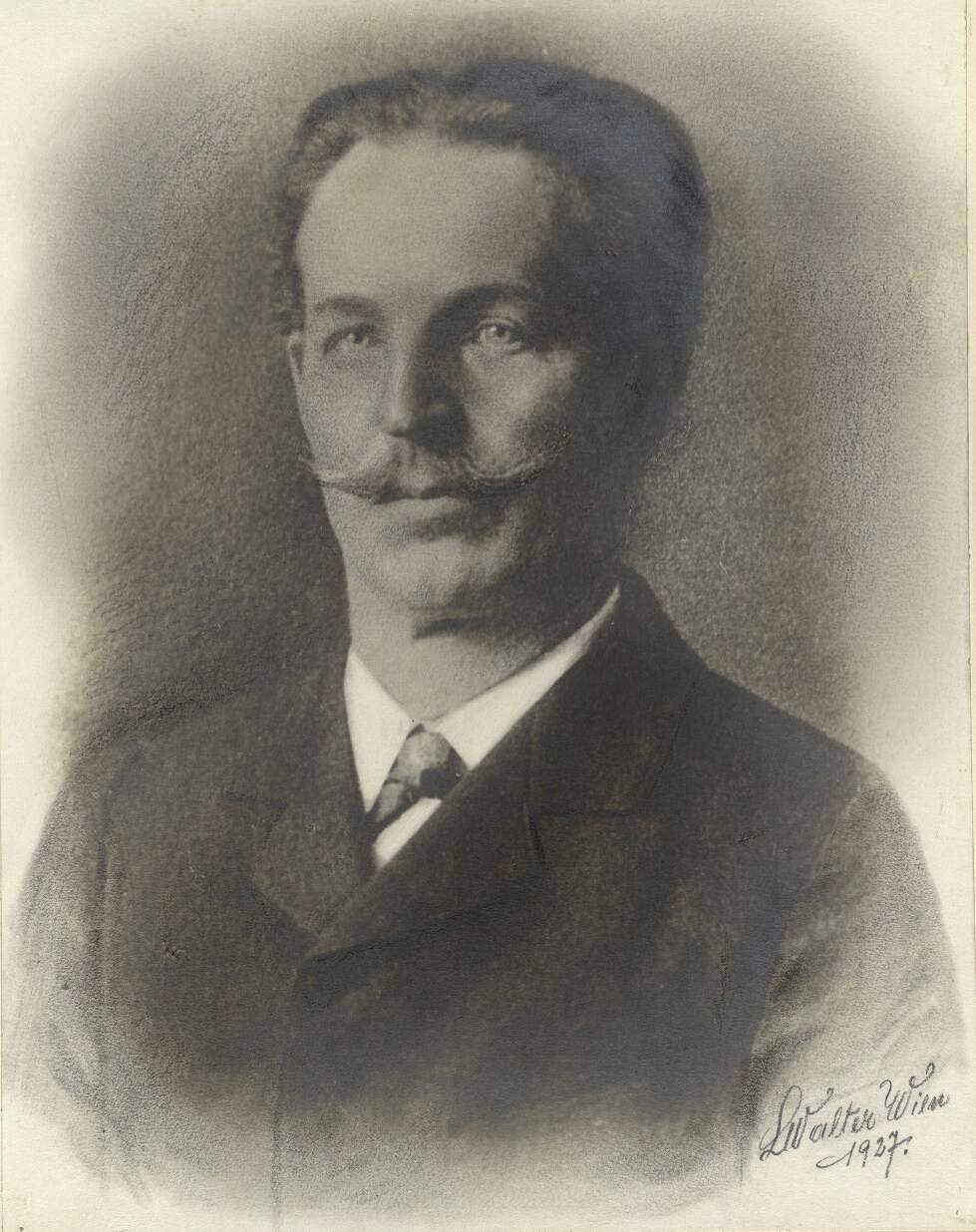

Paul Pfurtscheller (20 November 1855, Salzburg - 5 February 1927, Vienna) was an Austrian zoologist and natural history artist who produced a series of Zoologische Wandtafeln (Zoological Wall Charts) from 1902 to 1927. Such charts were initially used only in German-speaking countries, but soon became common elsewhere.

== Life and work ==
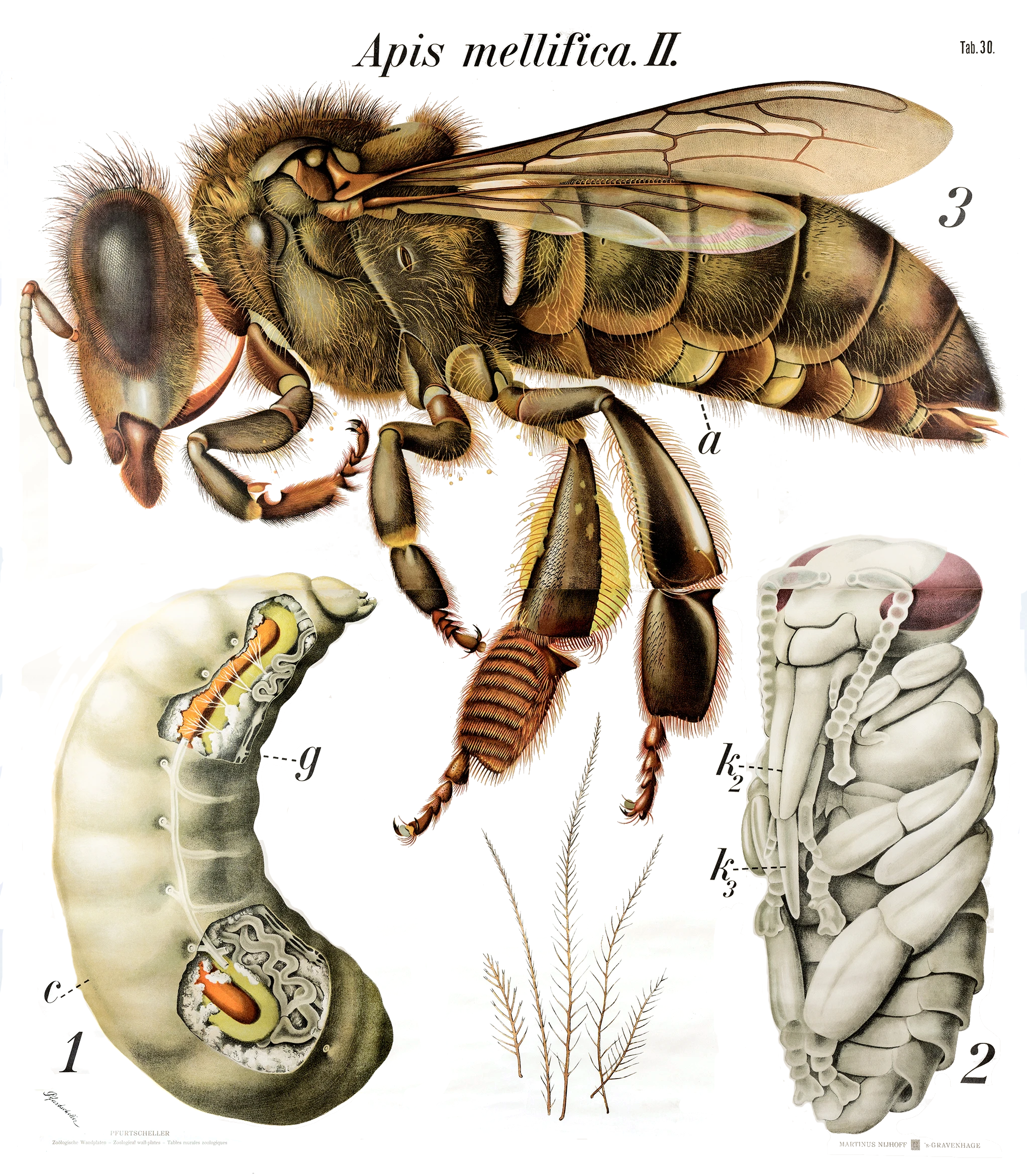
Poster of honeybee anatomy

Pfurtscheller was born in Salzburg where his father was a customs officer. He finished his schooling in 1874 at the Staatsgymnasium zu Salzburg. He had already shown talent in calligraphy in drawing. He then enrolled at the University of Vienna. In 1879, studying plant anatomy and physiology under Julius Ritter von Wiesner (1838–1916). He was awarded a PhD degree in 1878 and licensed to teach science. The next six years saw him teaching at the Franz-Josef Gymnasium, and then for three more years at a high school in Vienna. He then returned to the Franz-Josef Gymnasium, remaining there until his retirement in January 1911. From 1877 he was a member of the Zoological and Botanical Society.

Although he received no formal art training, he created the wall charts to illustrate his teaching lessons, and these were later used by the University Zoological Institute and highly regarded by eminent zoologists. The main motivation was not the non-availability of teaching material but the large classroom sizes that he had to deal with. He completed 38 plates and work on the 39th, which showed a dissection of the Oriental cockroach, was halted by his death, but was later completed.

The charts were originally published by 'A. Pichler's Witwe & Sohn und Buchhandlung Lehrmittelanstalt', a bookstore specialising in educational literature and teaching aids in Vienna and Leipzig. Sold individually, they were often varnished, resulting in a yellowish appearance with ageing. The first five charts went on sale in 1902, and some 70 in total were planned. The charts were last listed in a Martinus Nijhoff catalogue in 1953.

Pfurtscheller's wallcharts had a leading position in Spanish secondary school classrooms and were photographed as a regular feature in the classrooms alongside the pupils and teachers portrayed. At the university level, it is possible to find presence of these plates at the young University of Murcia, which, as in the case of the laboratory of the laboratory of the Institute of Valencia.

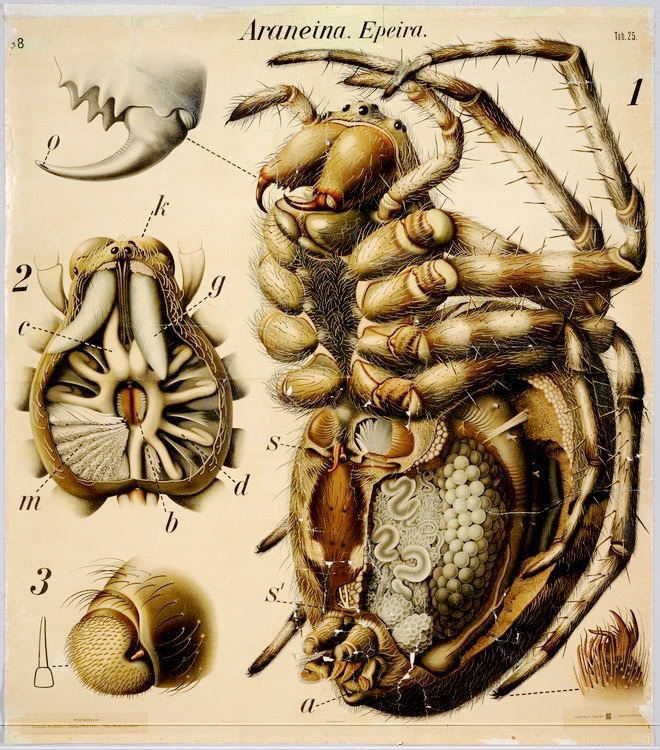
Araneus diadematus dissection

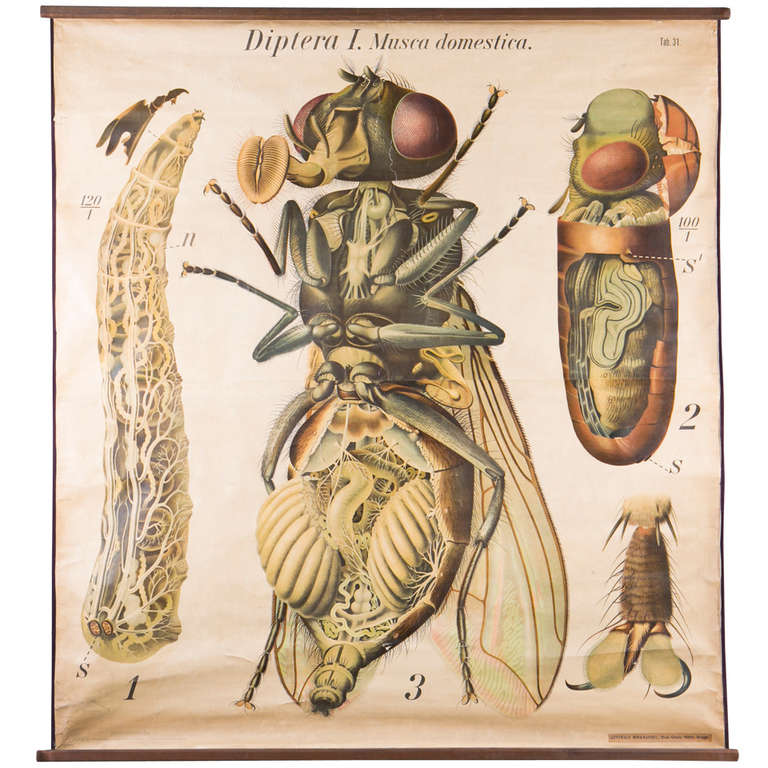
Musca domestica dissection

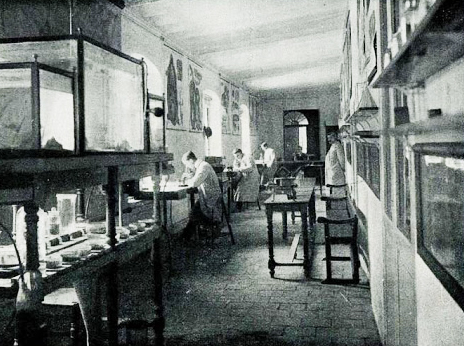
Pfurtscheller's wallcharts in the High School in Valencia

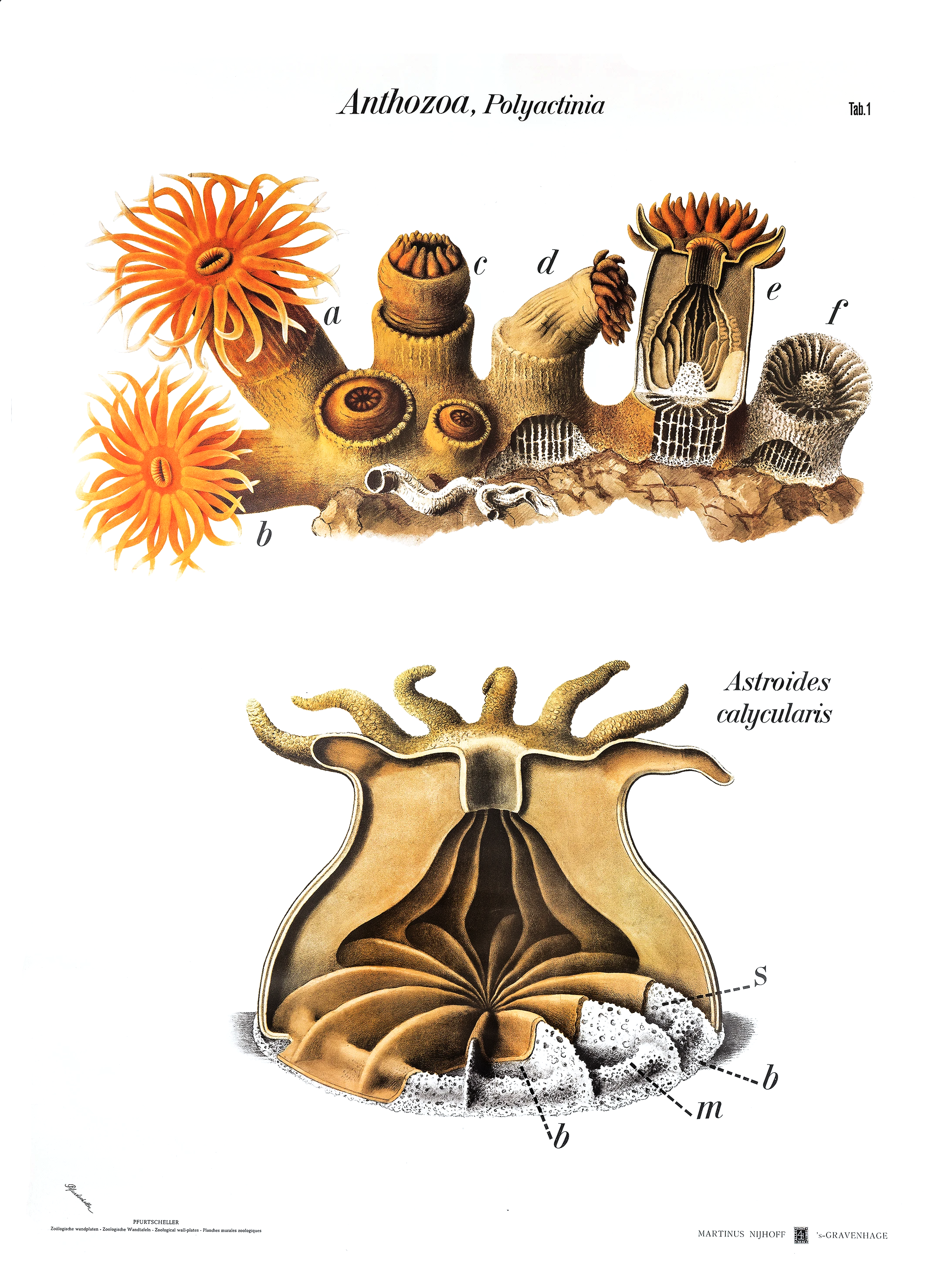
1

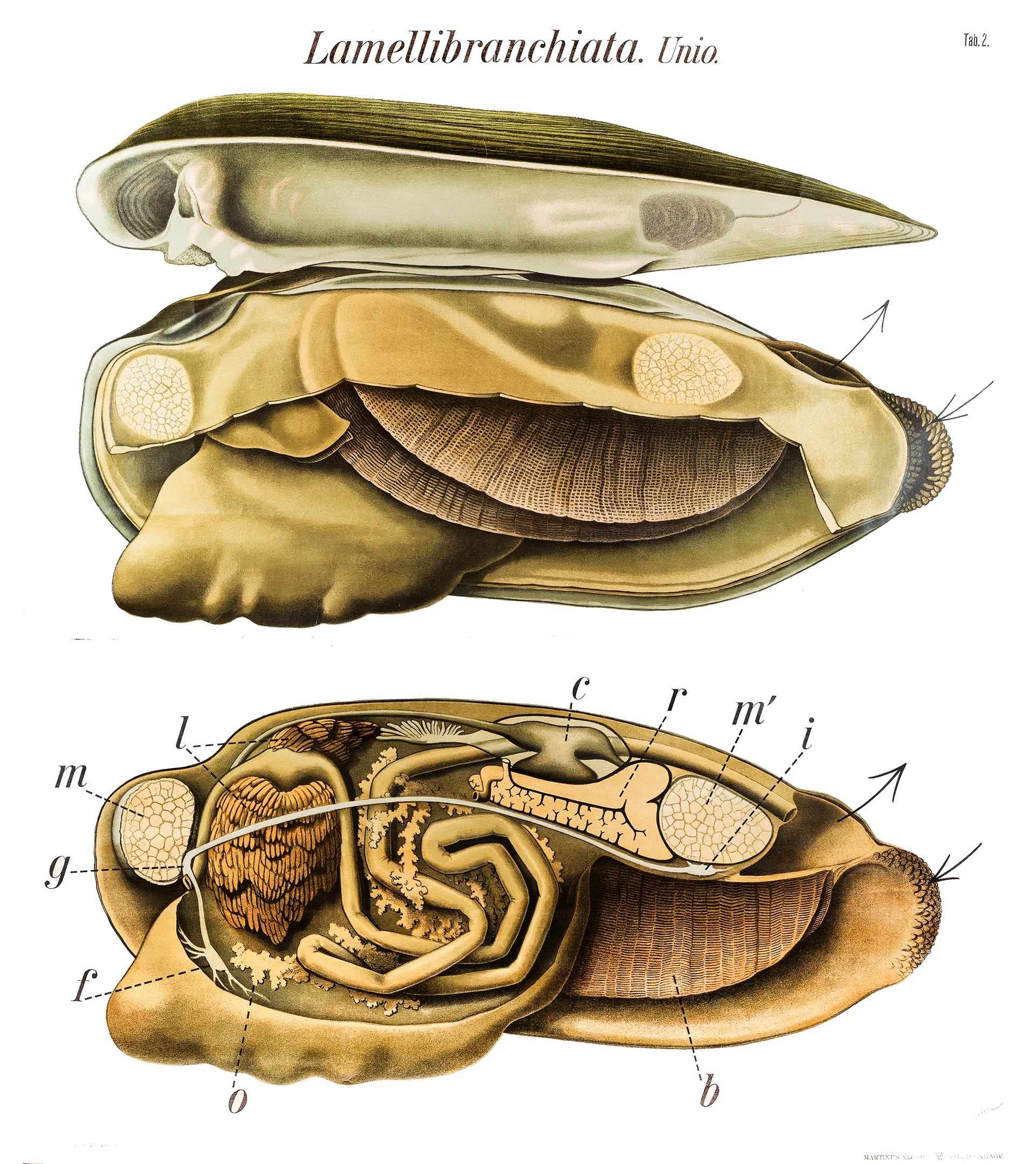
2

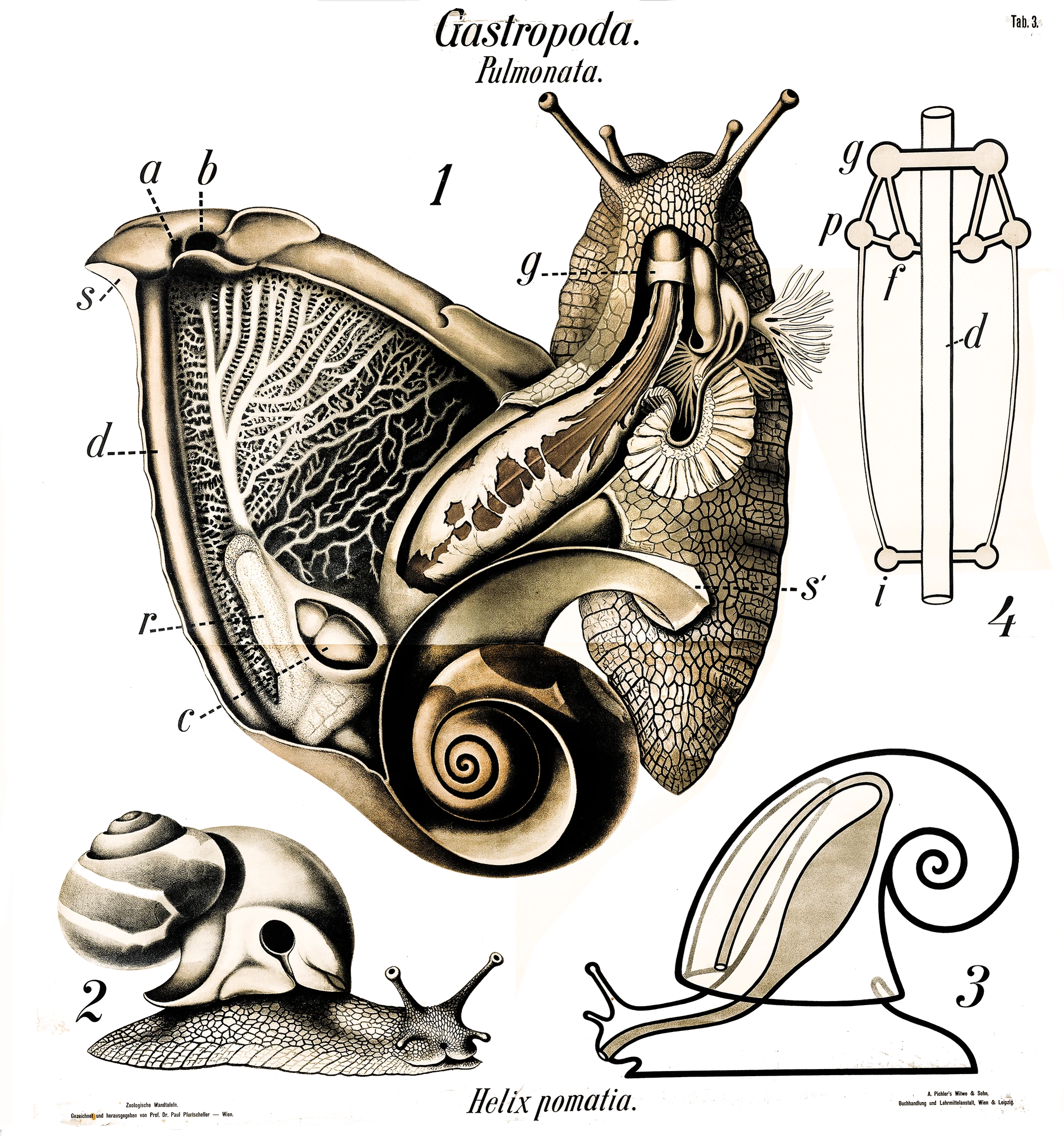
3

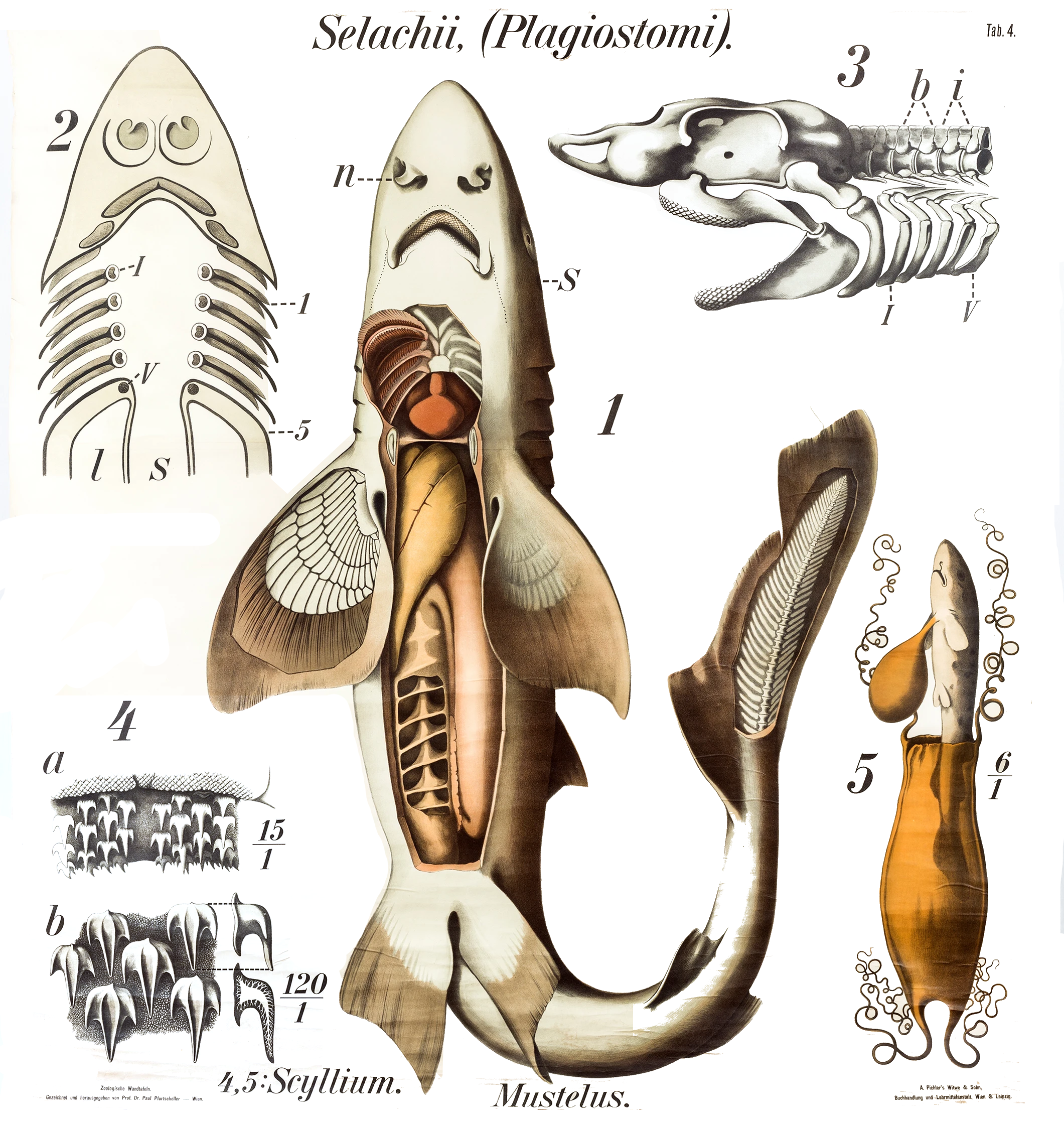
4

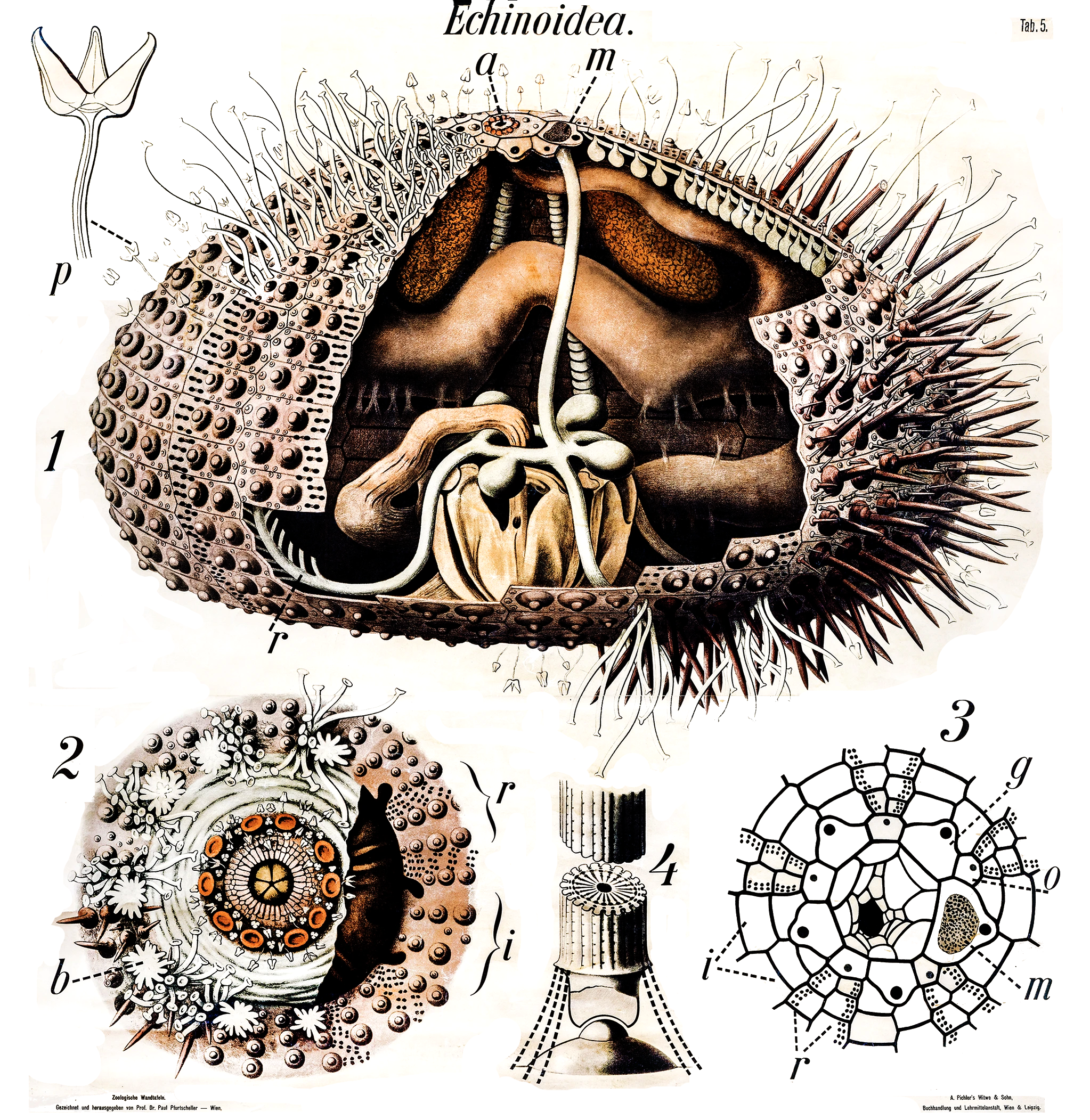
5

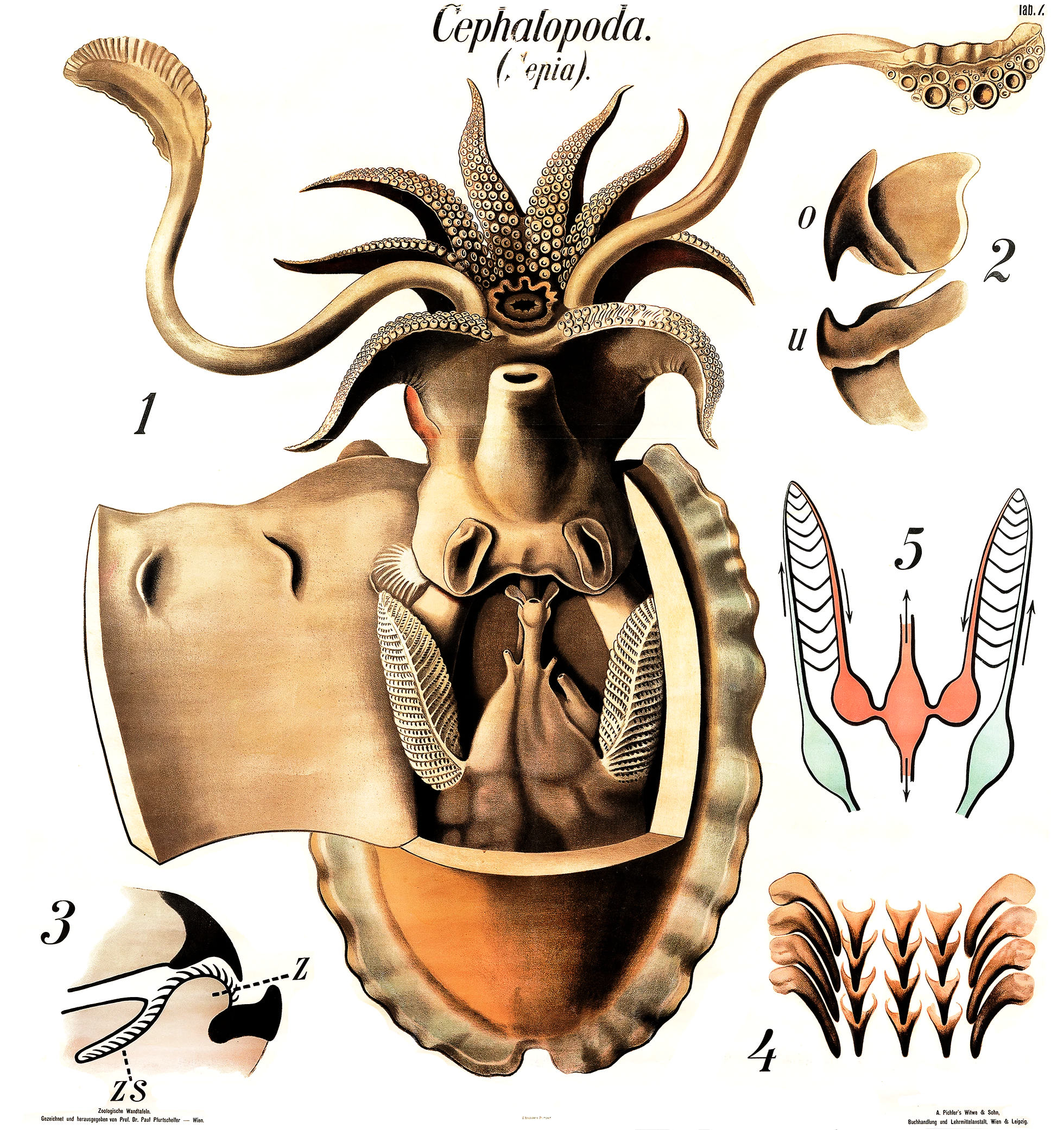
7

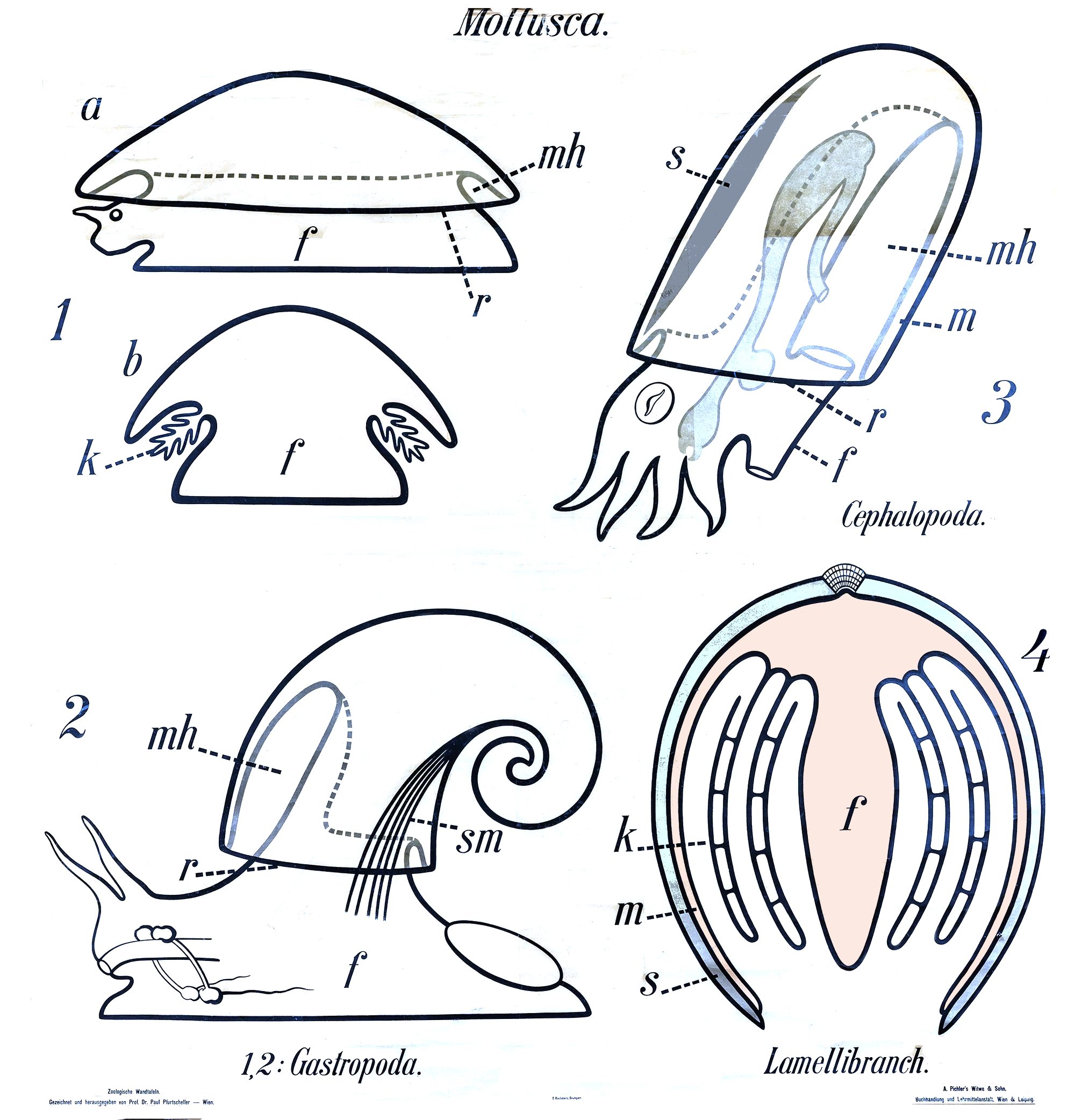
8

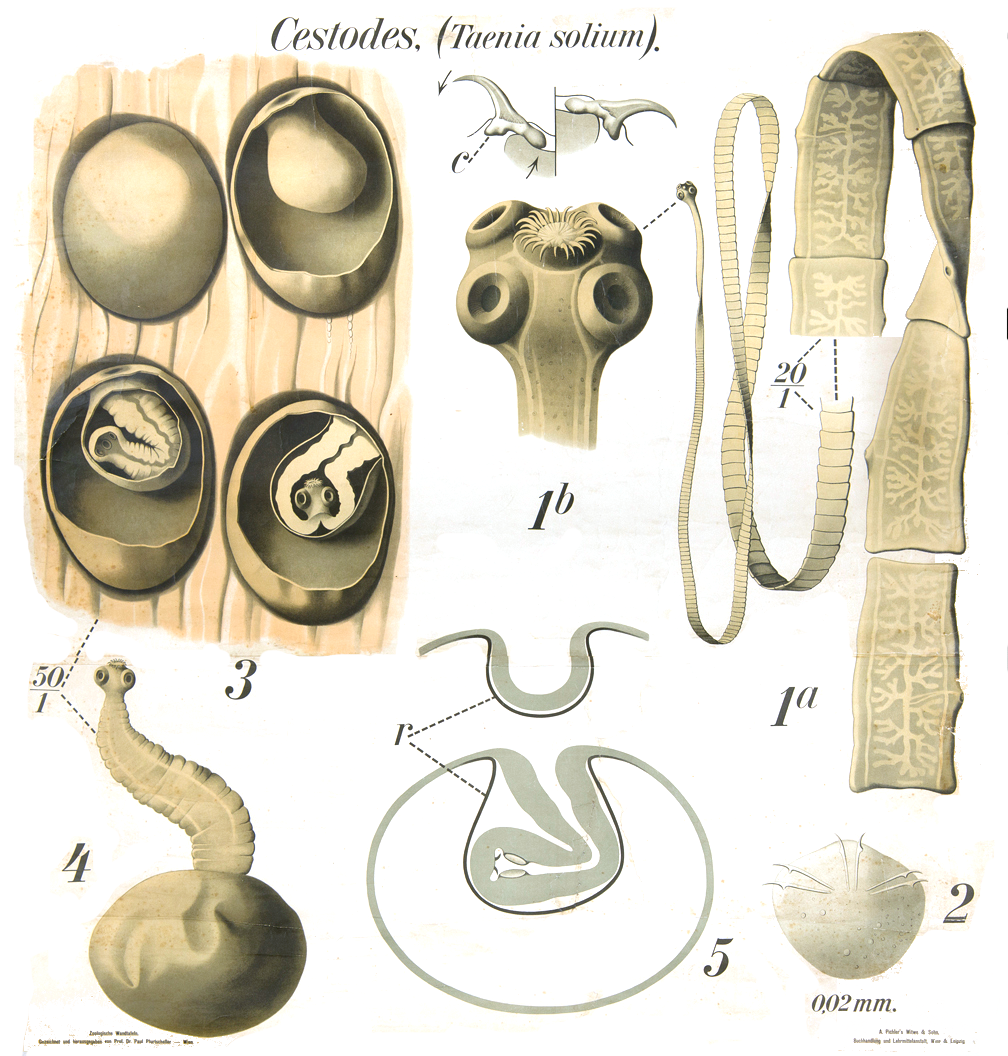
9

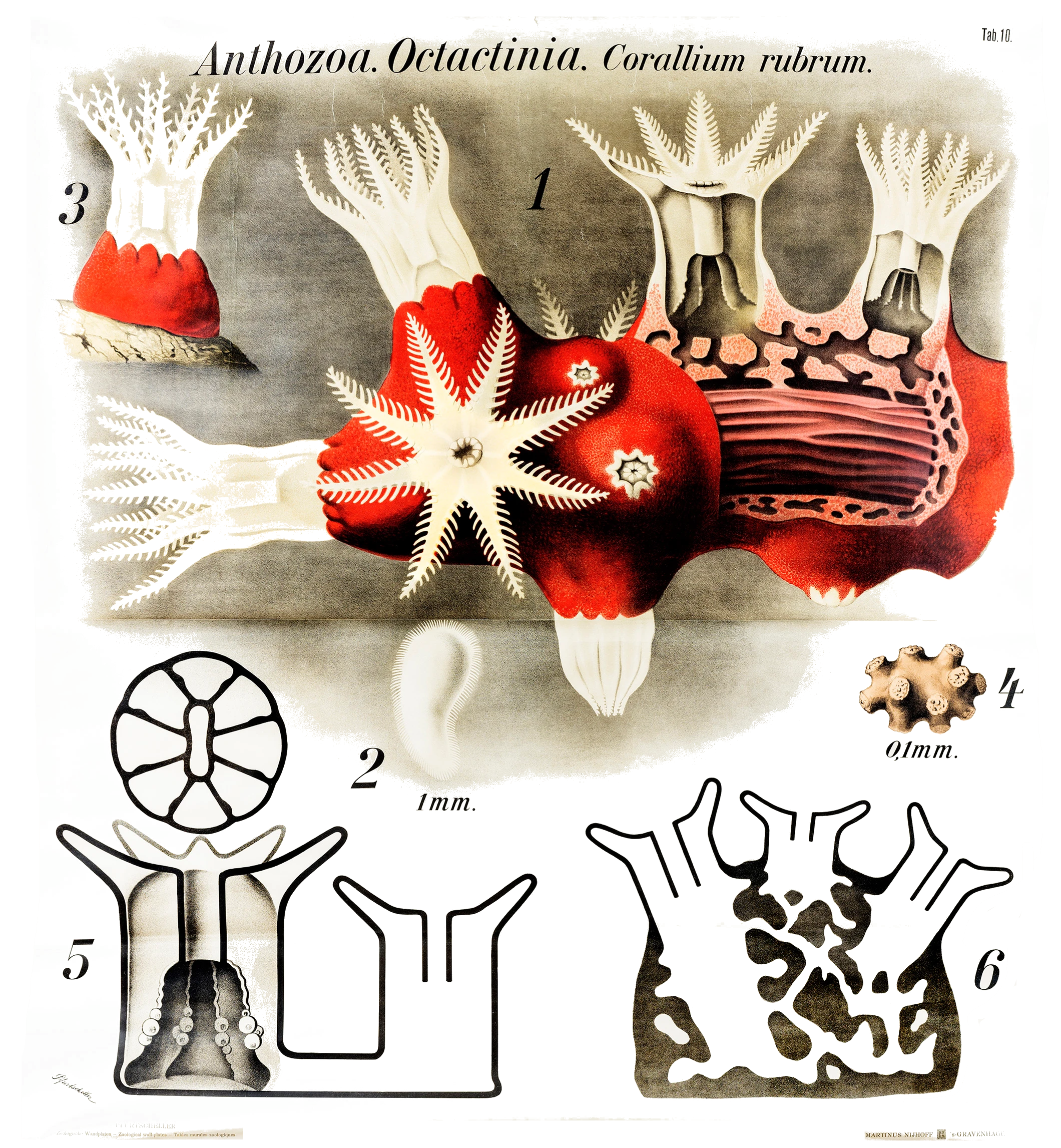
10

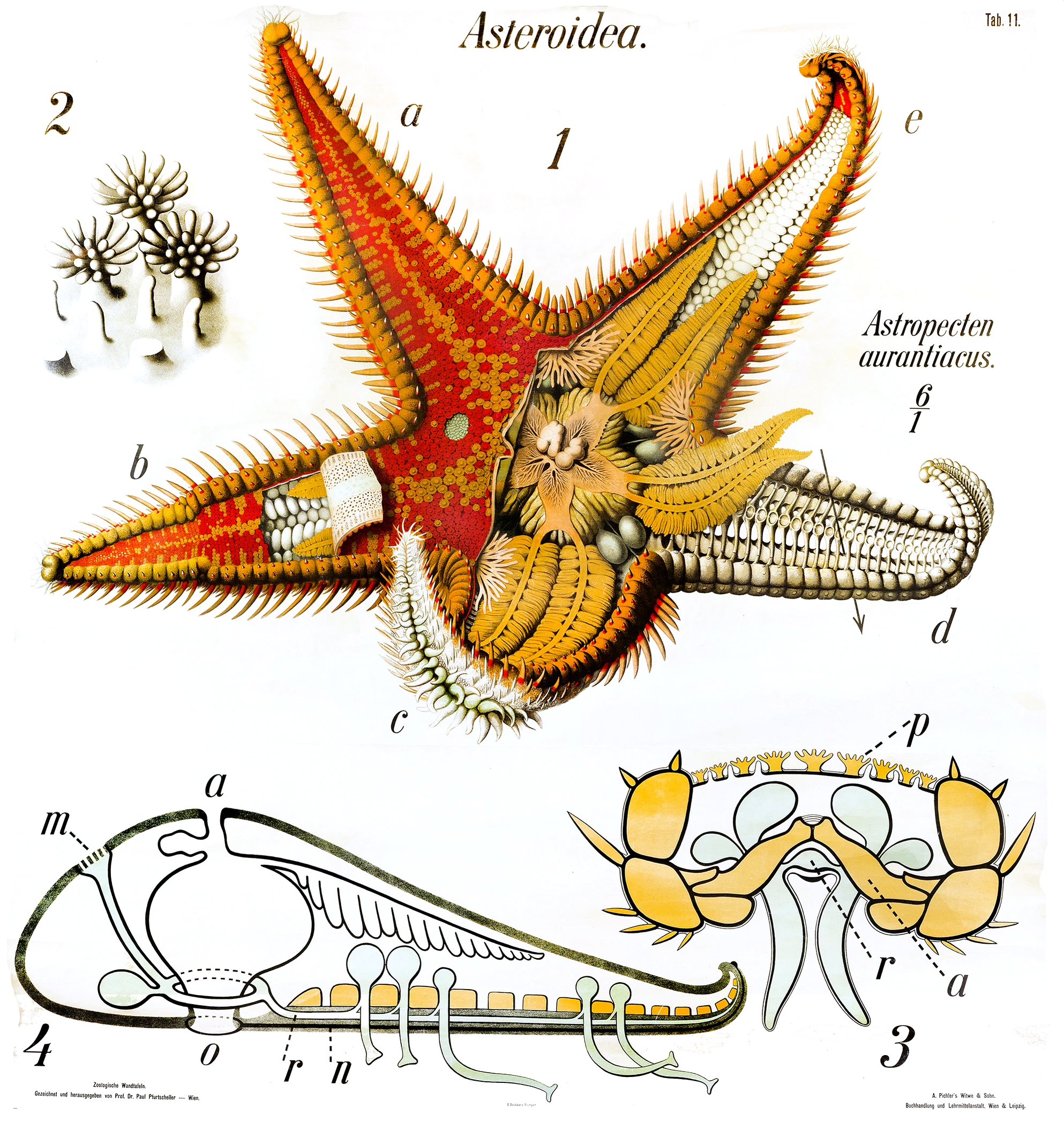
11

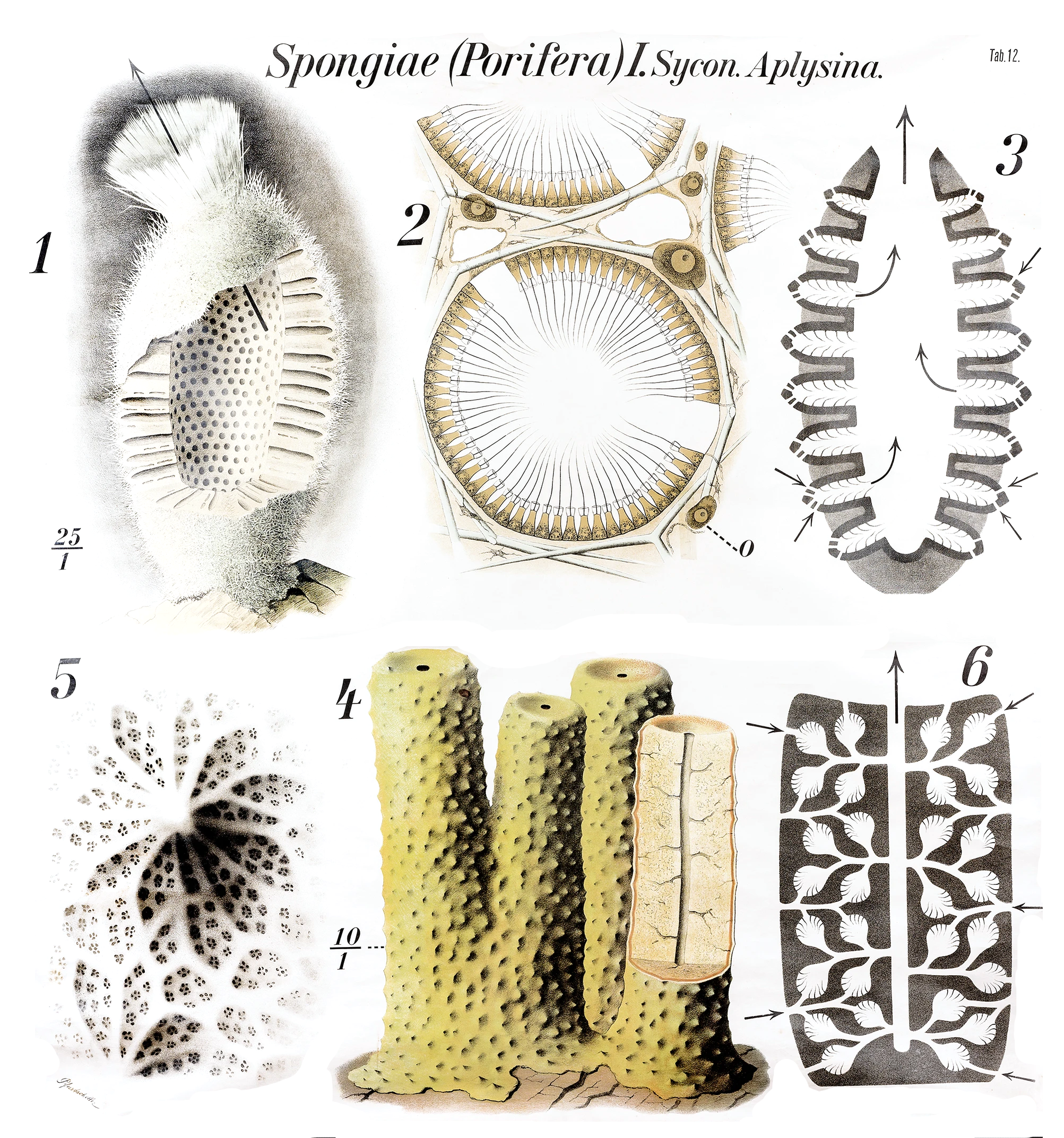
12

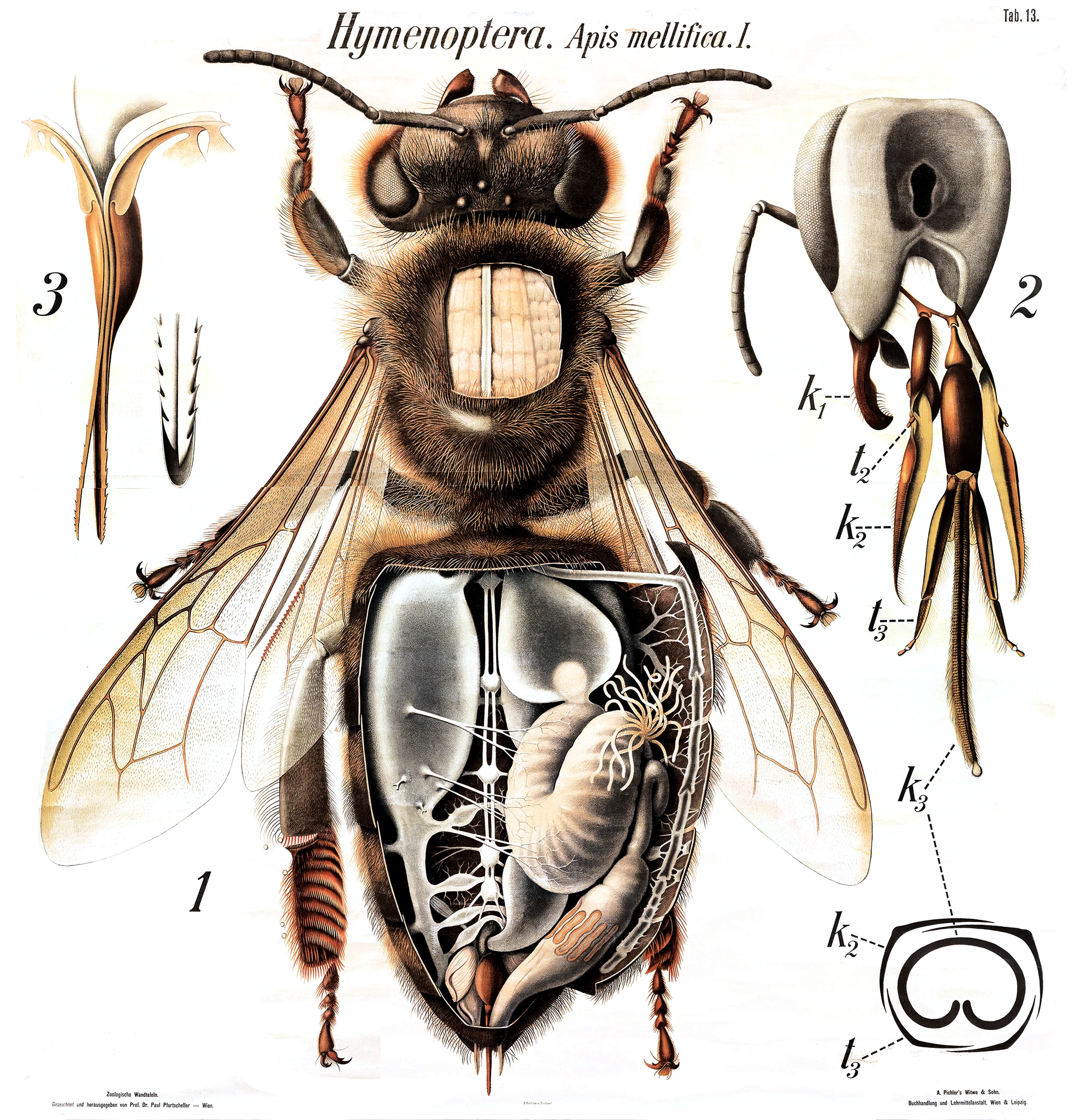
13

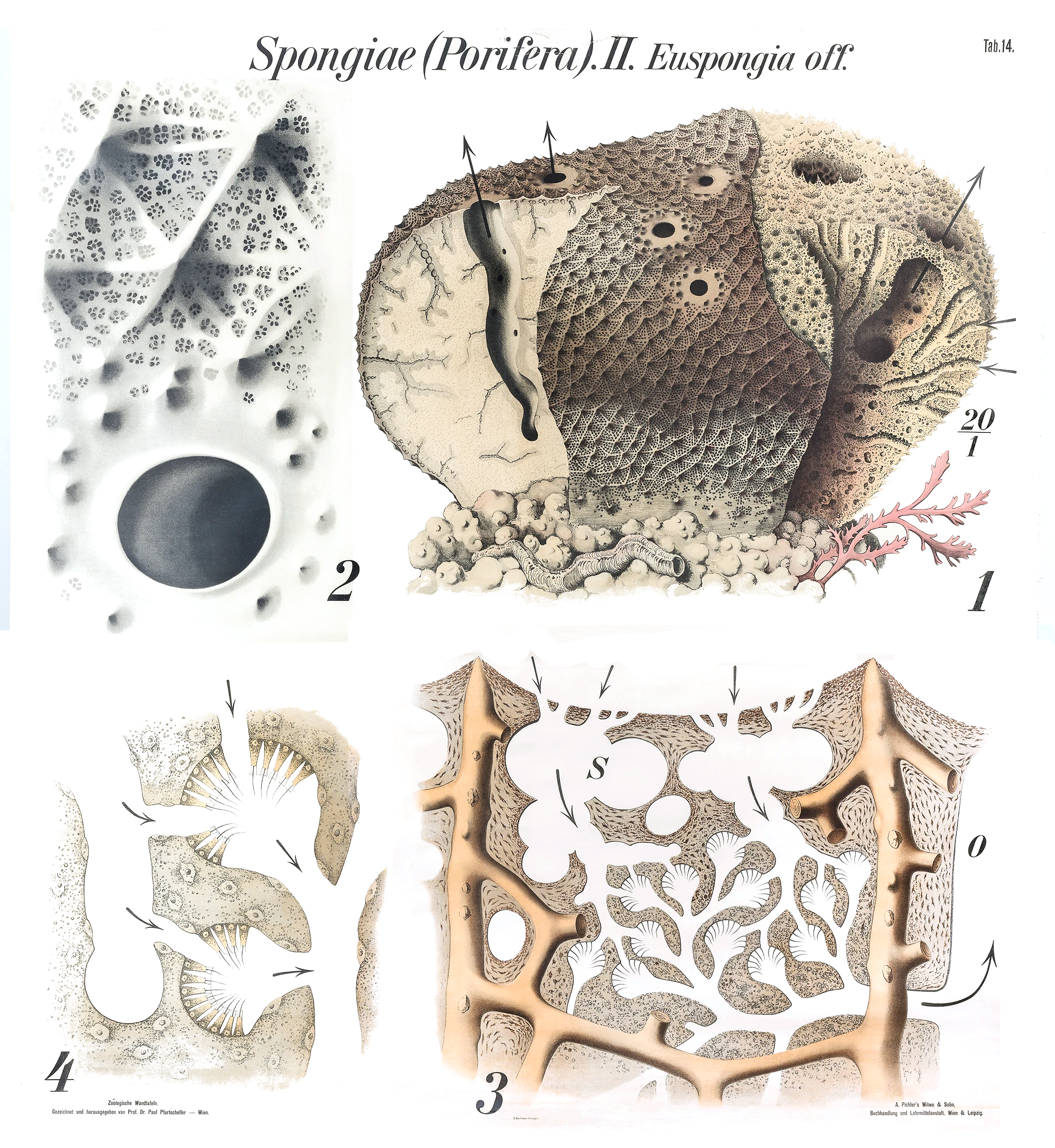
14

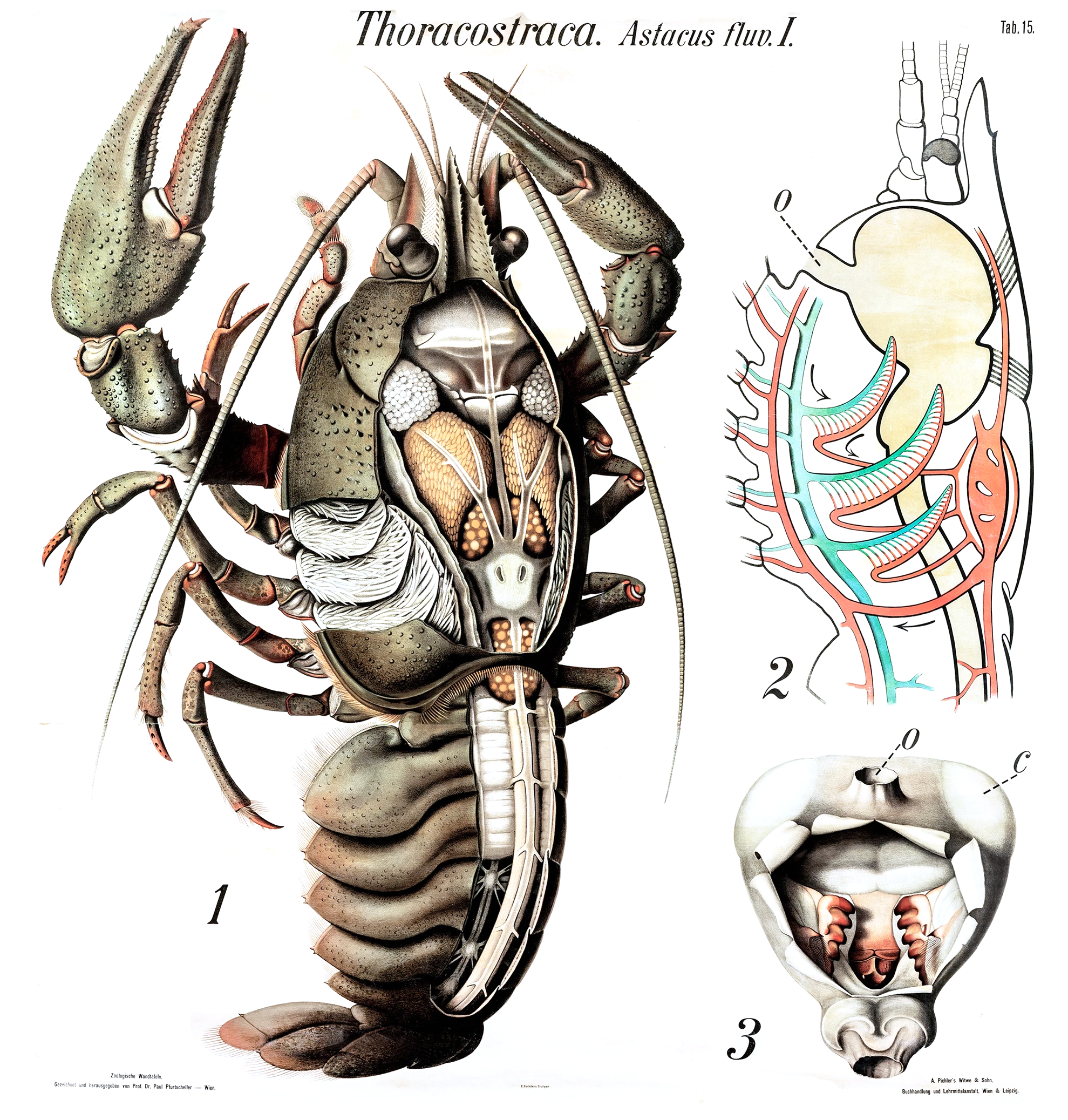
15

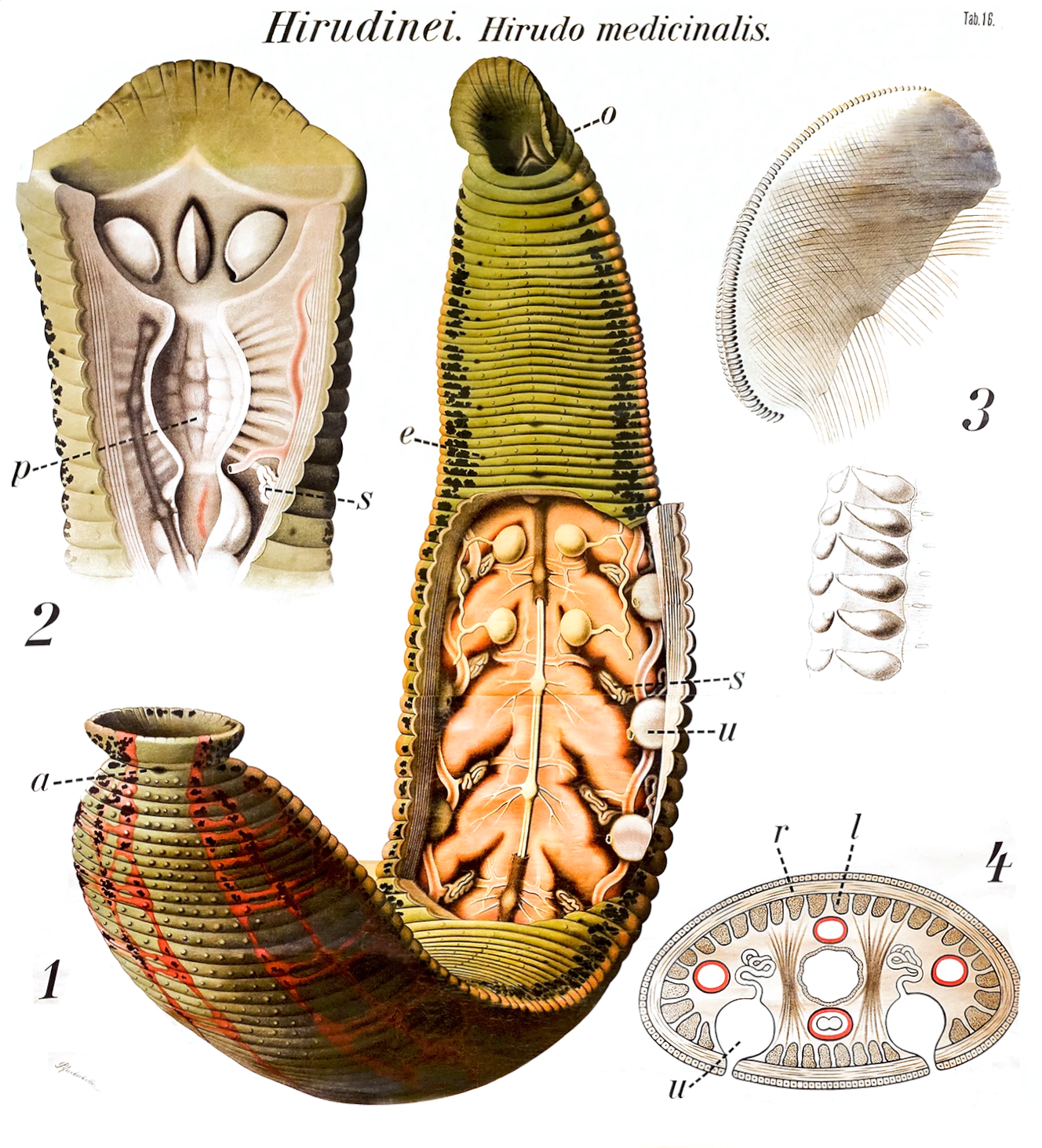
16

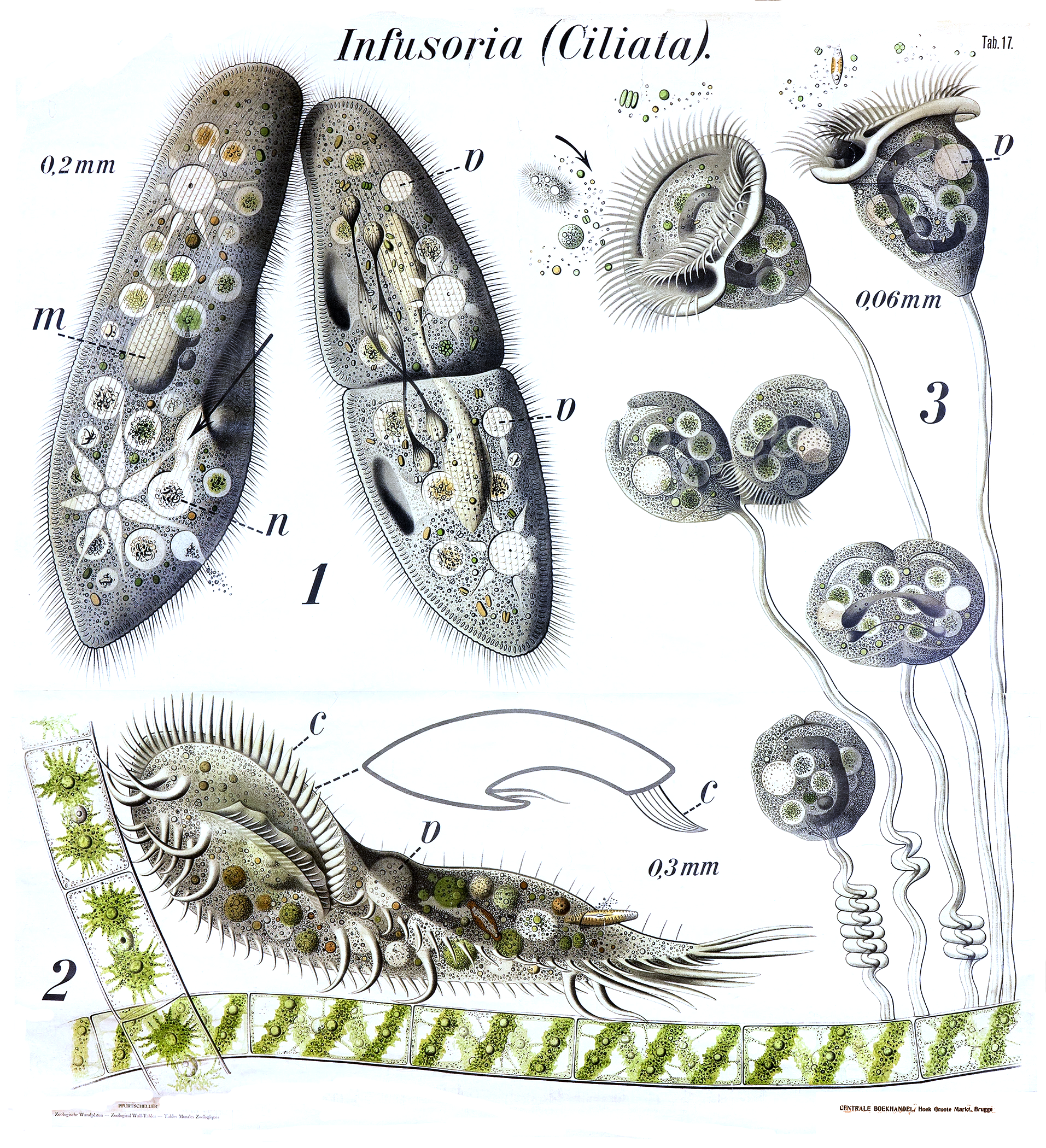
17

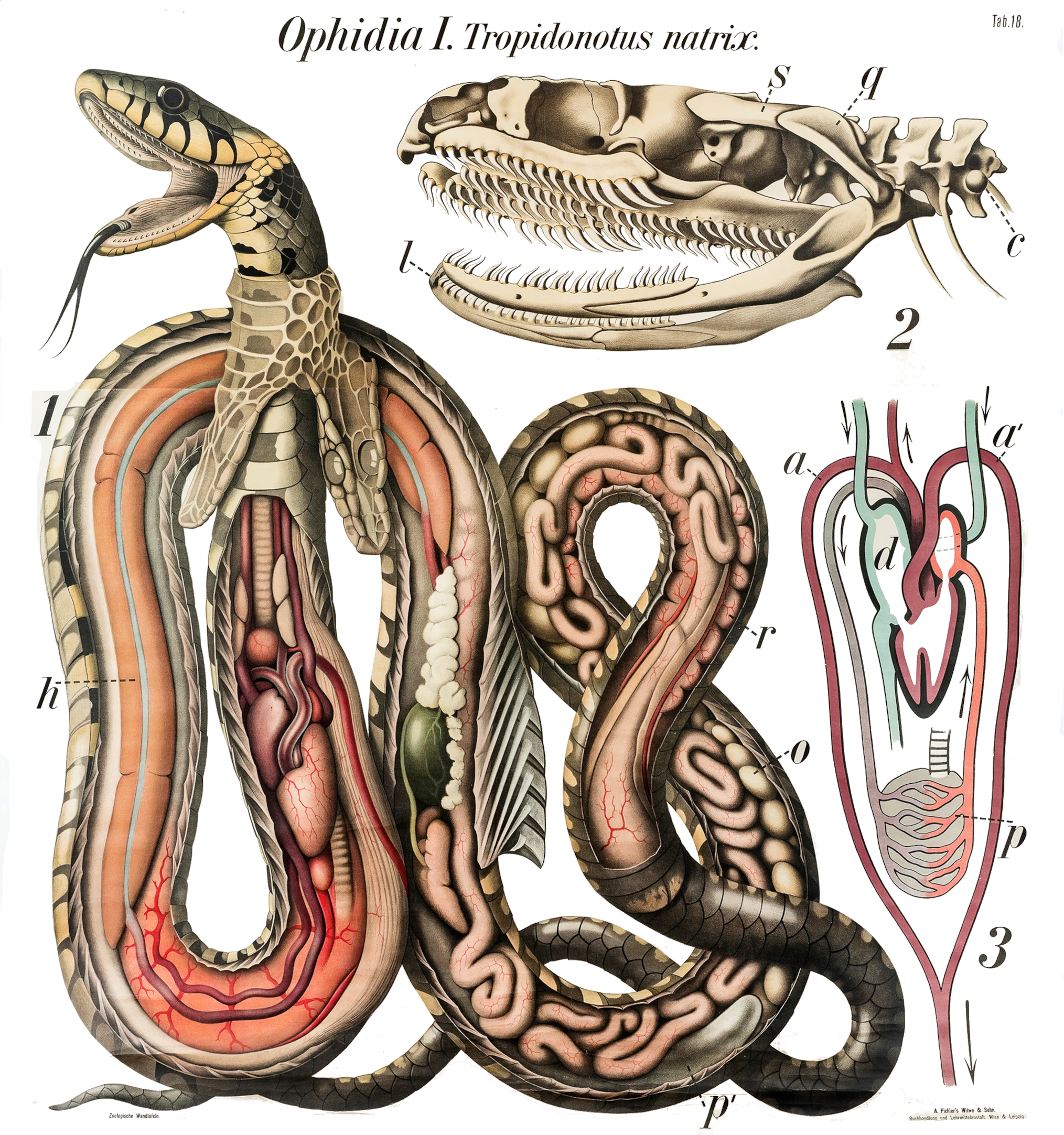
18

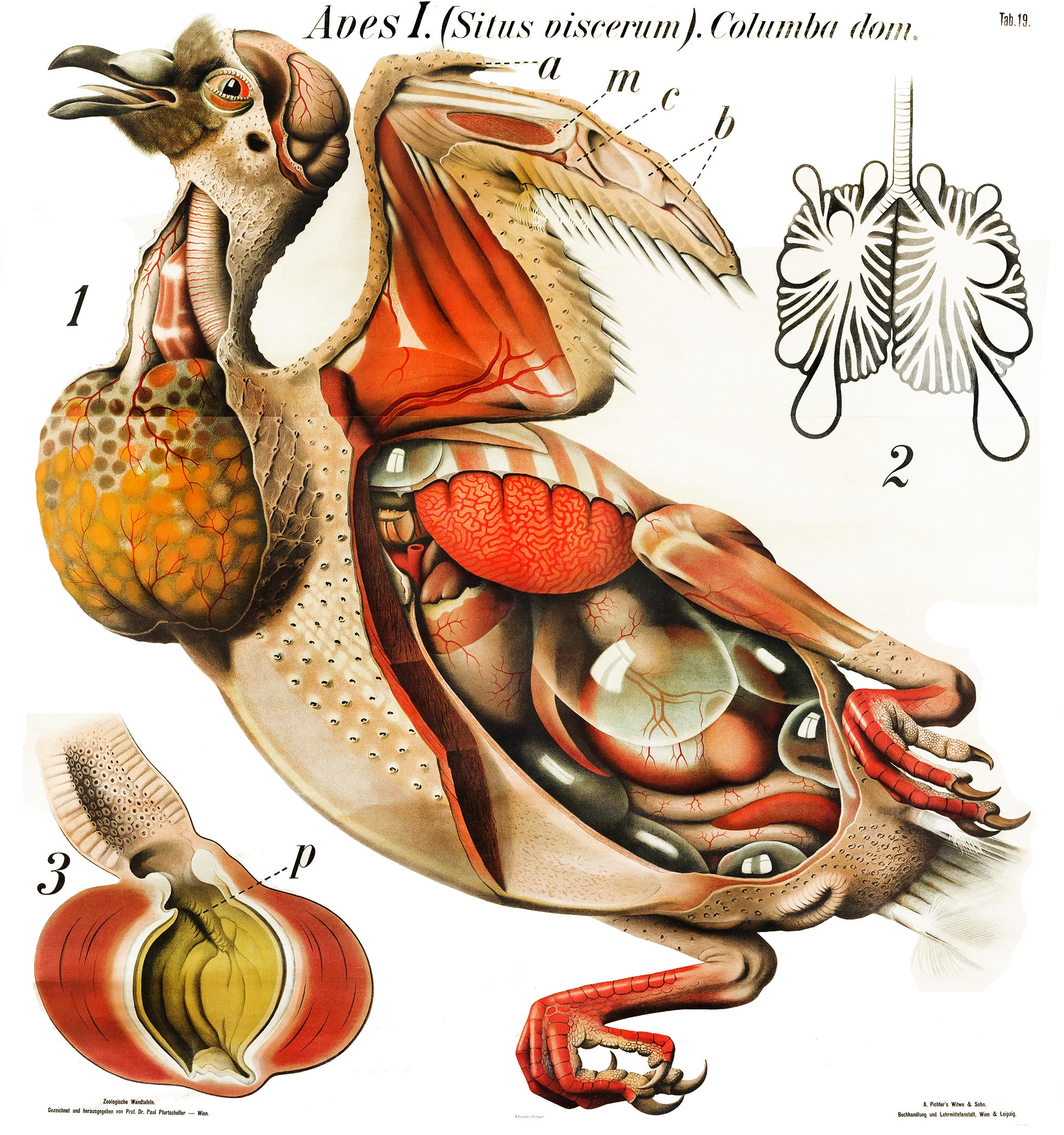
19

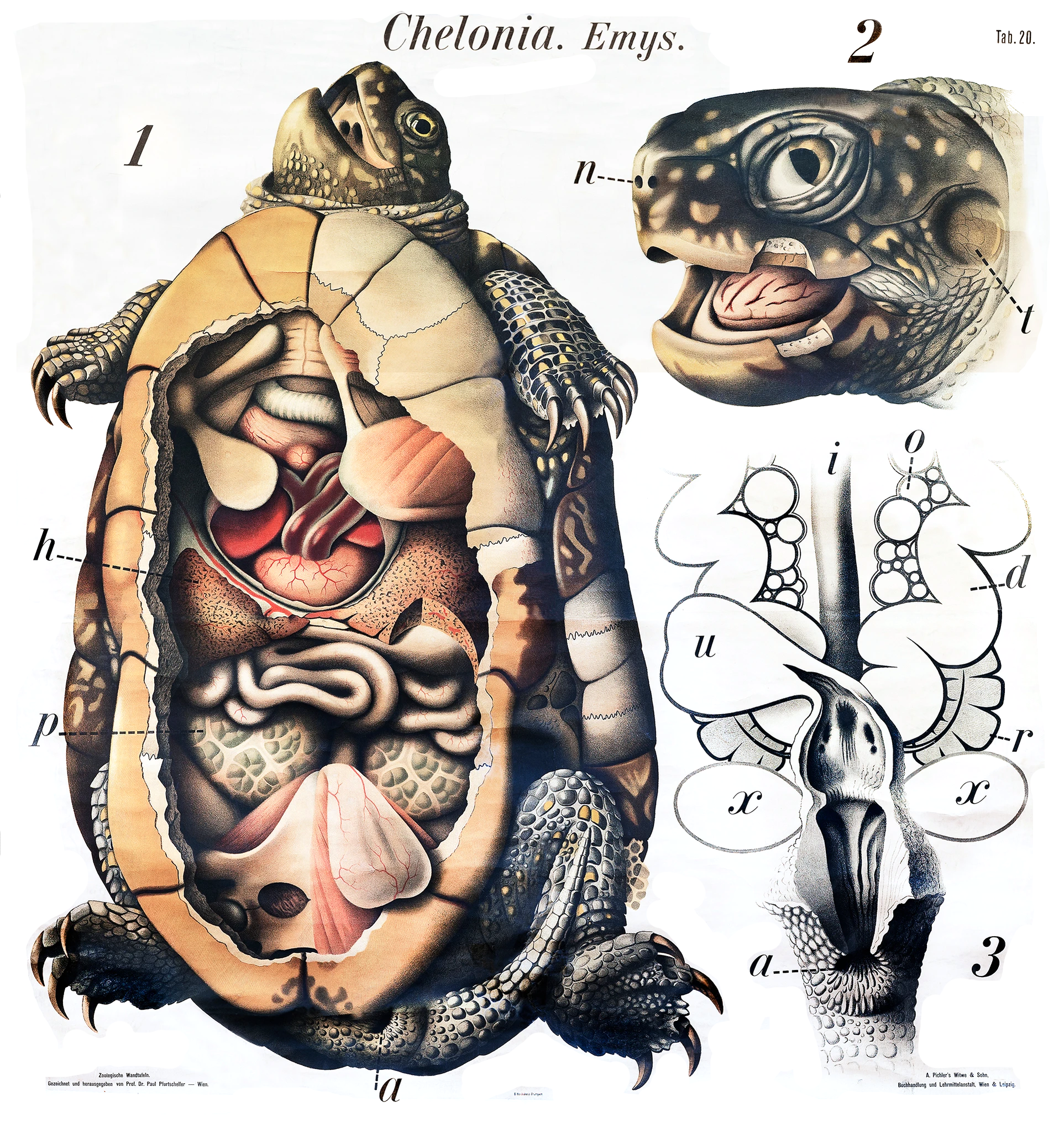
20

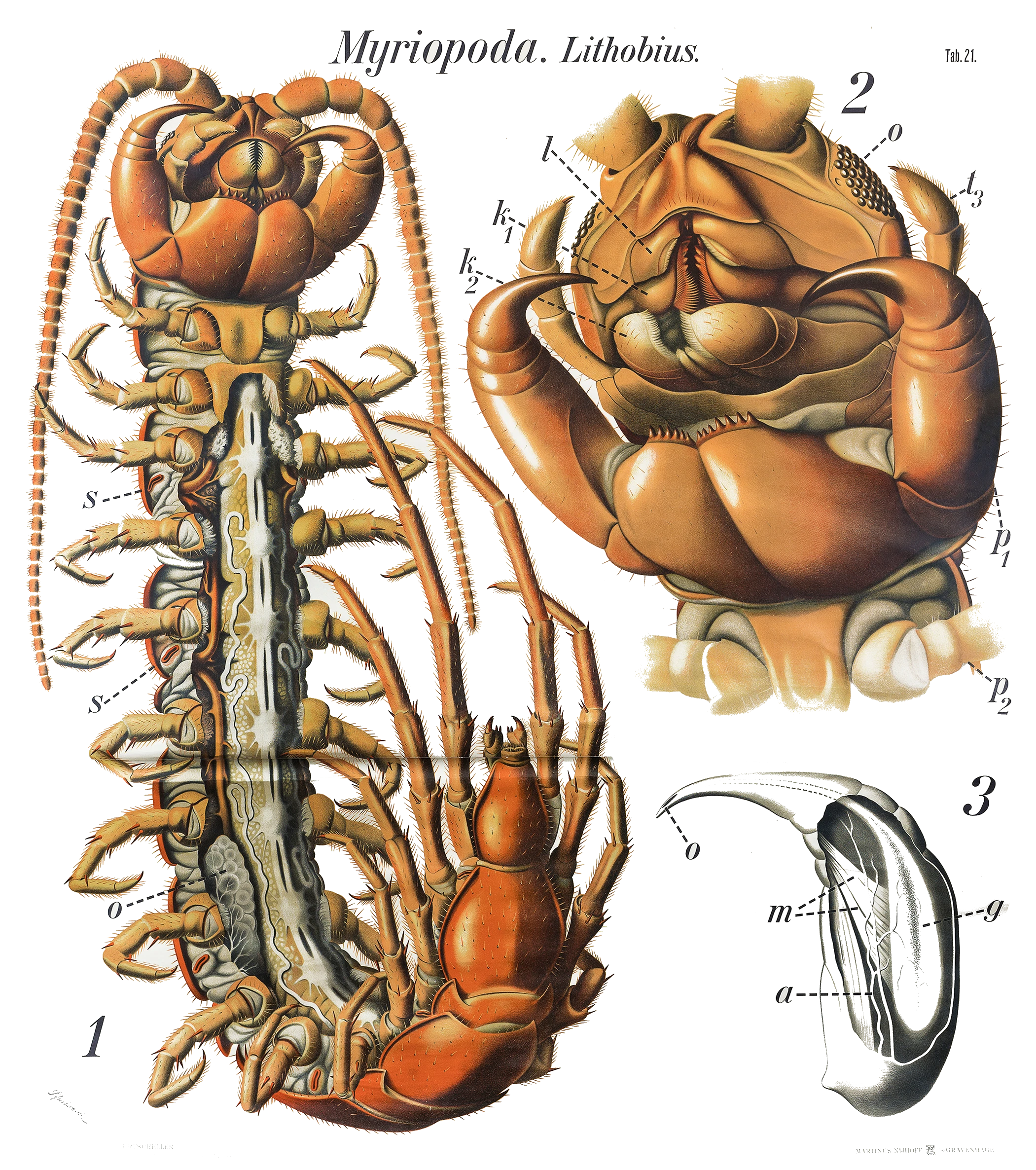
21

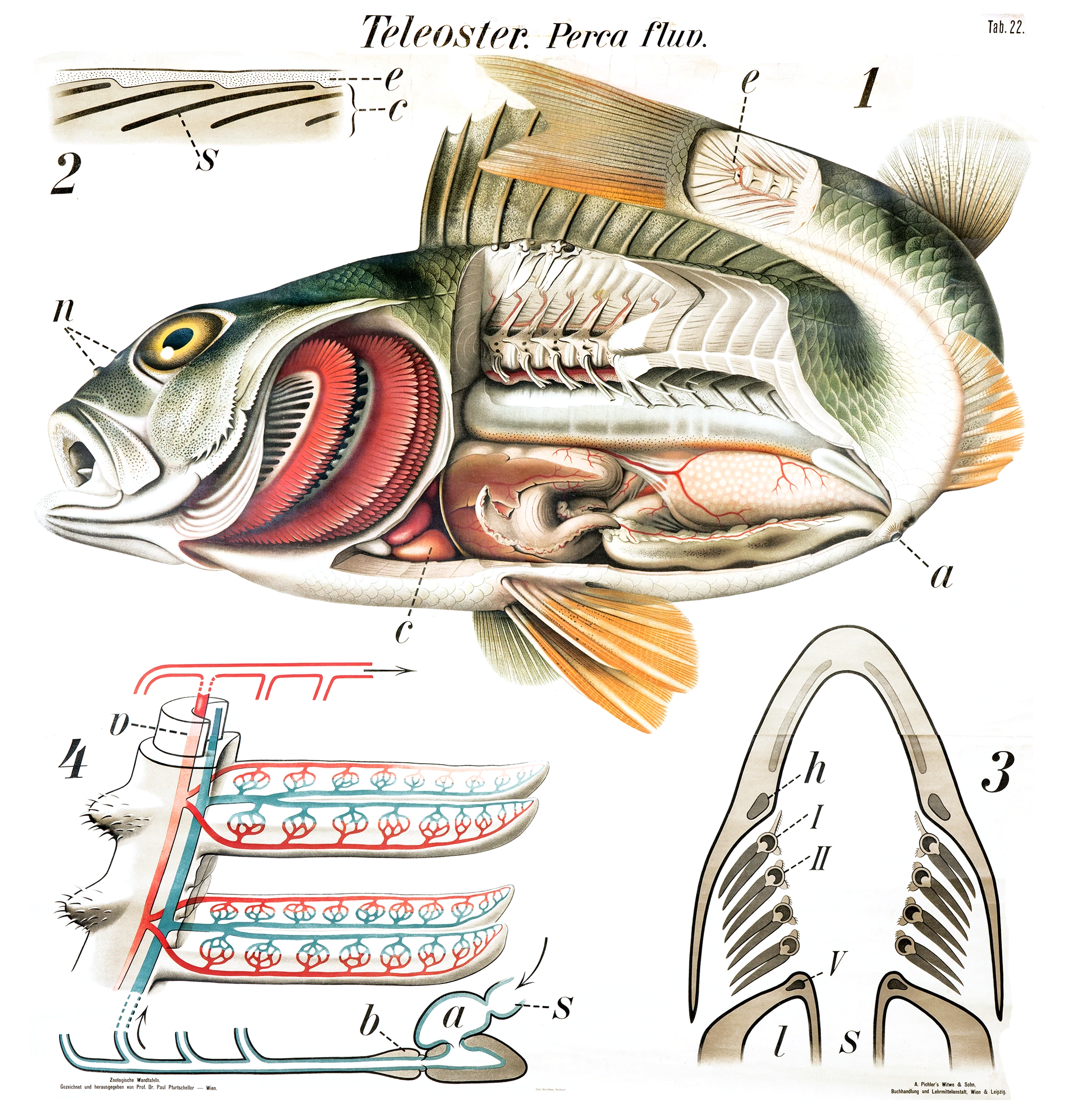
22

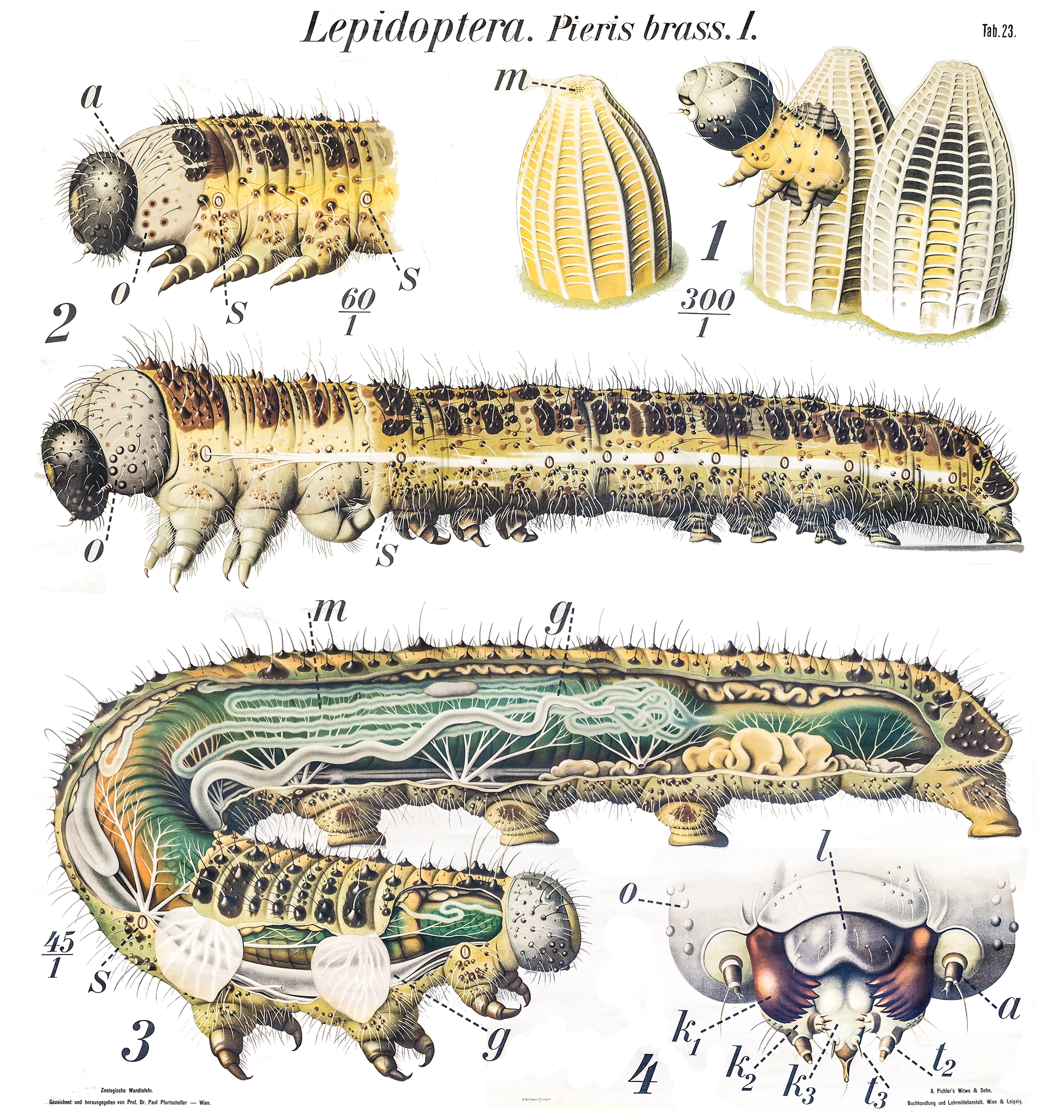
23

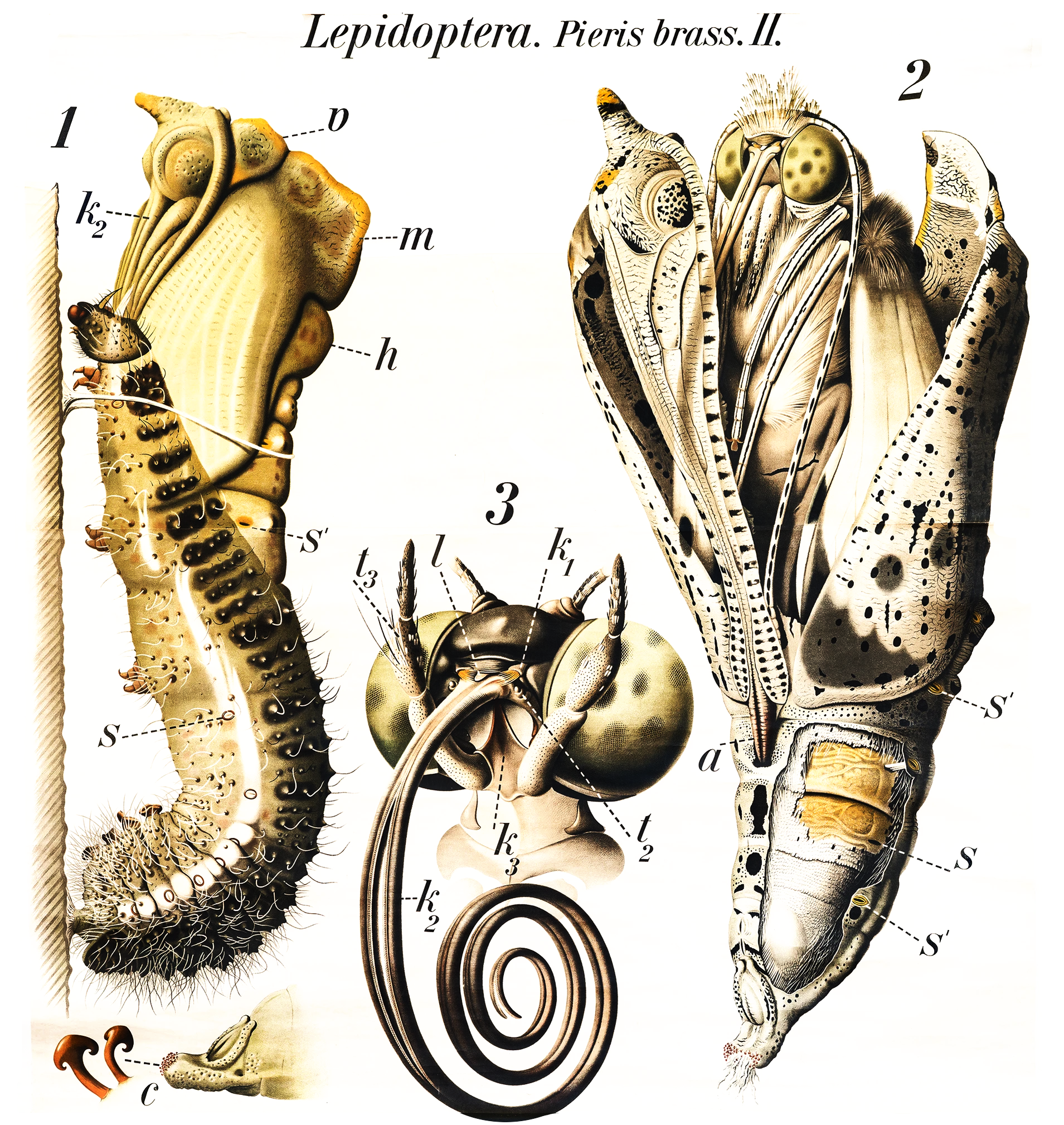
24

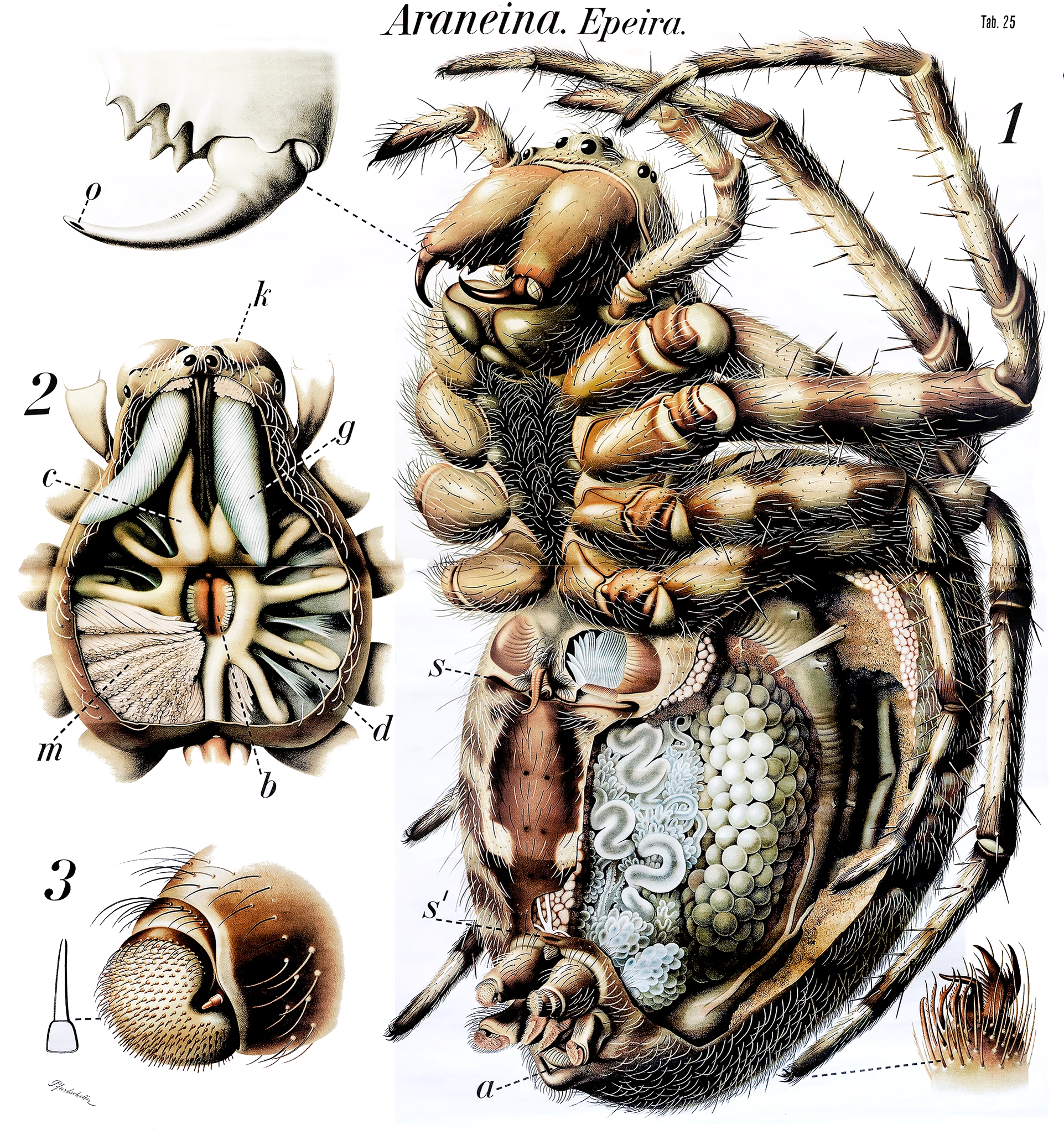
25

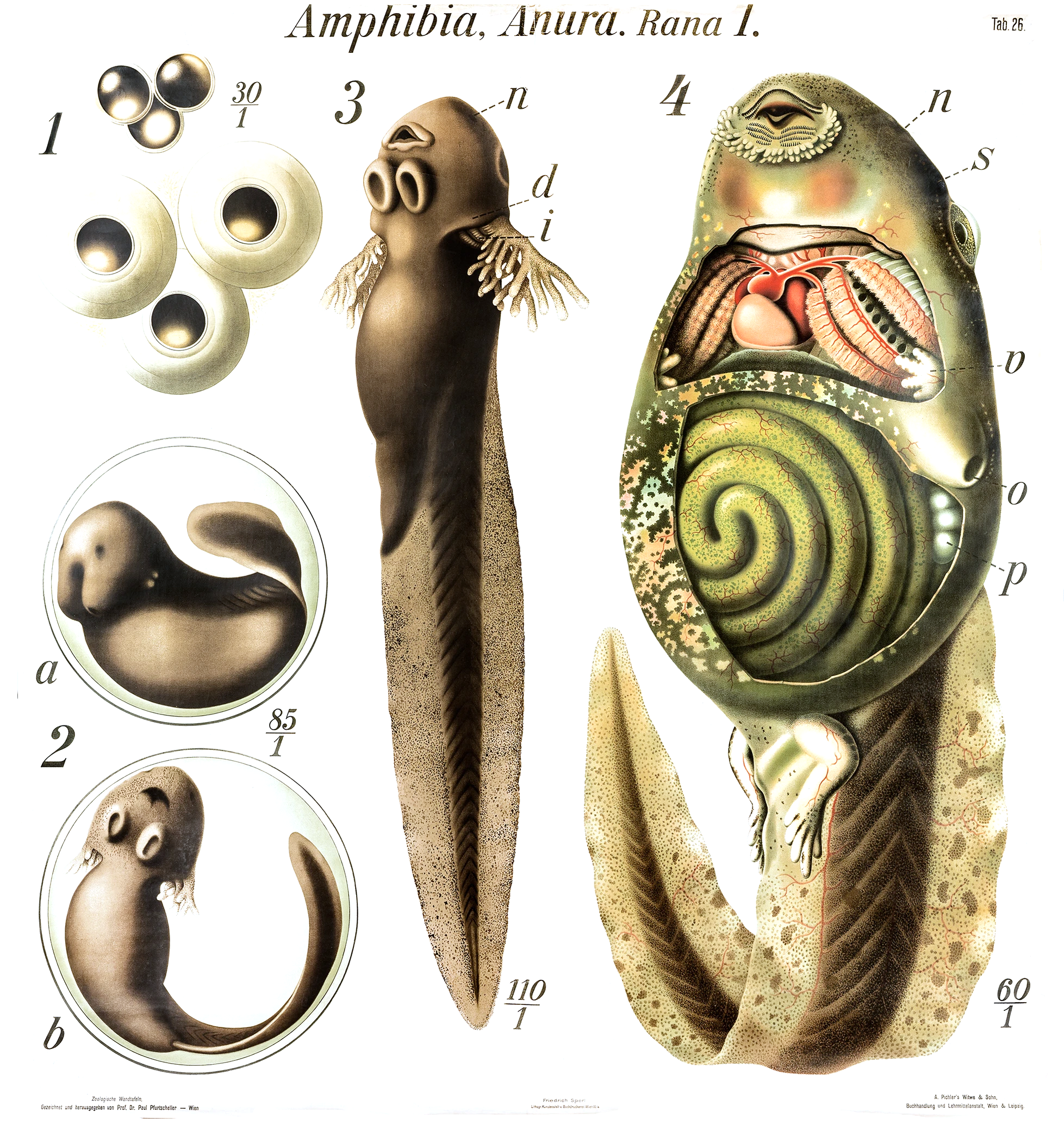
26

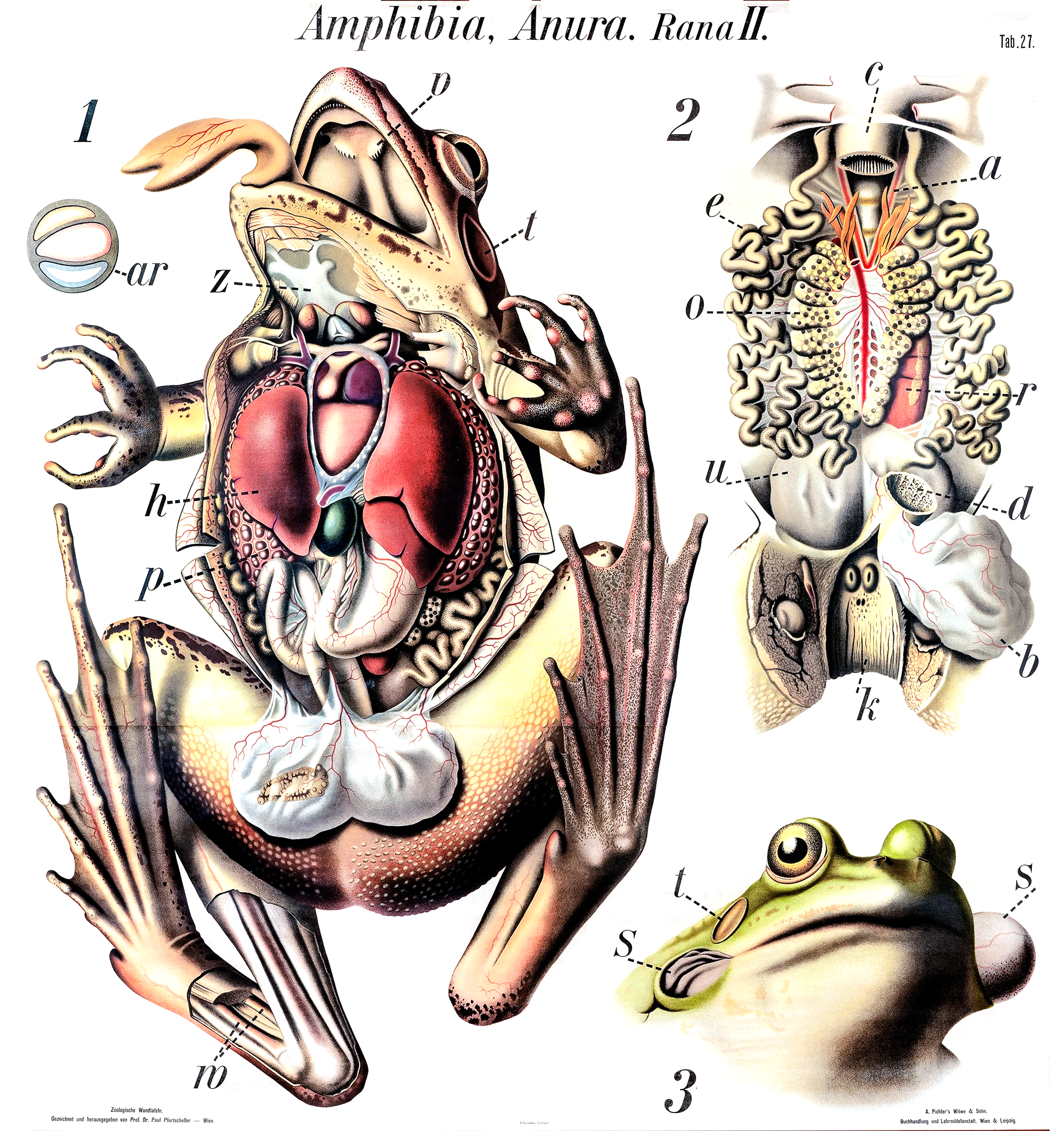
27

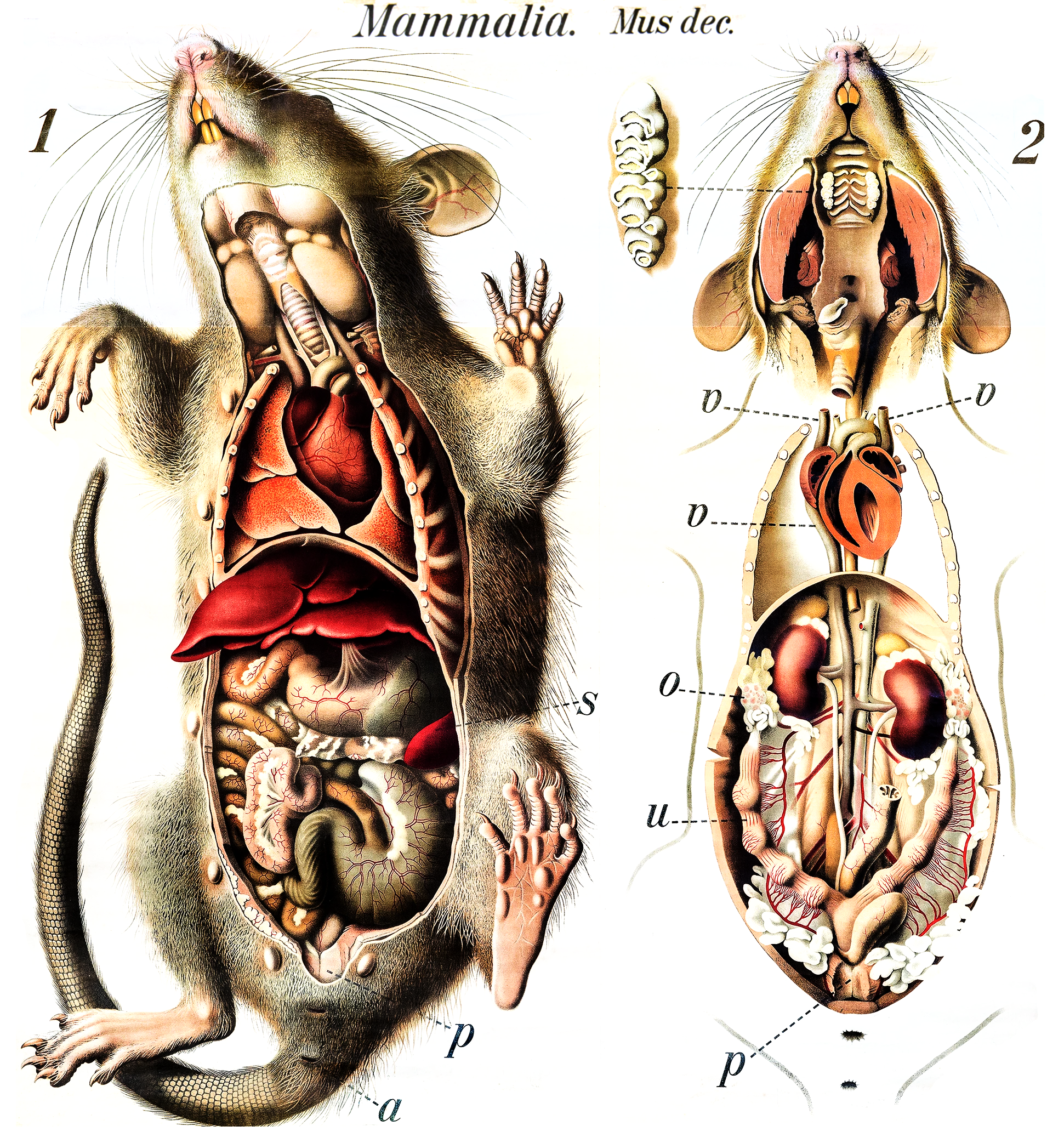
28

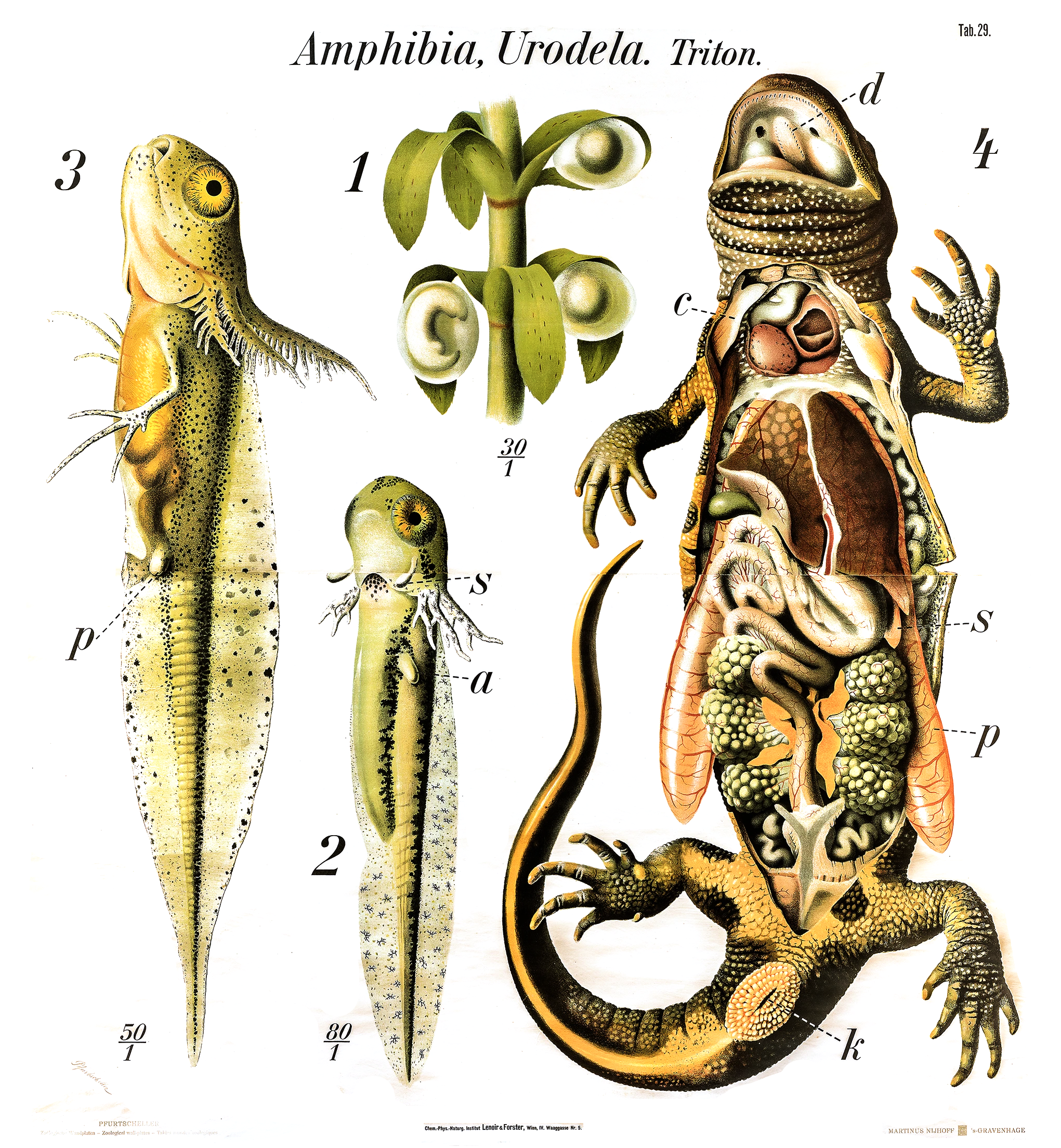
29

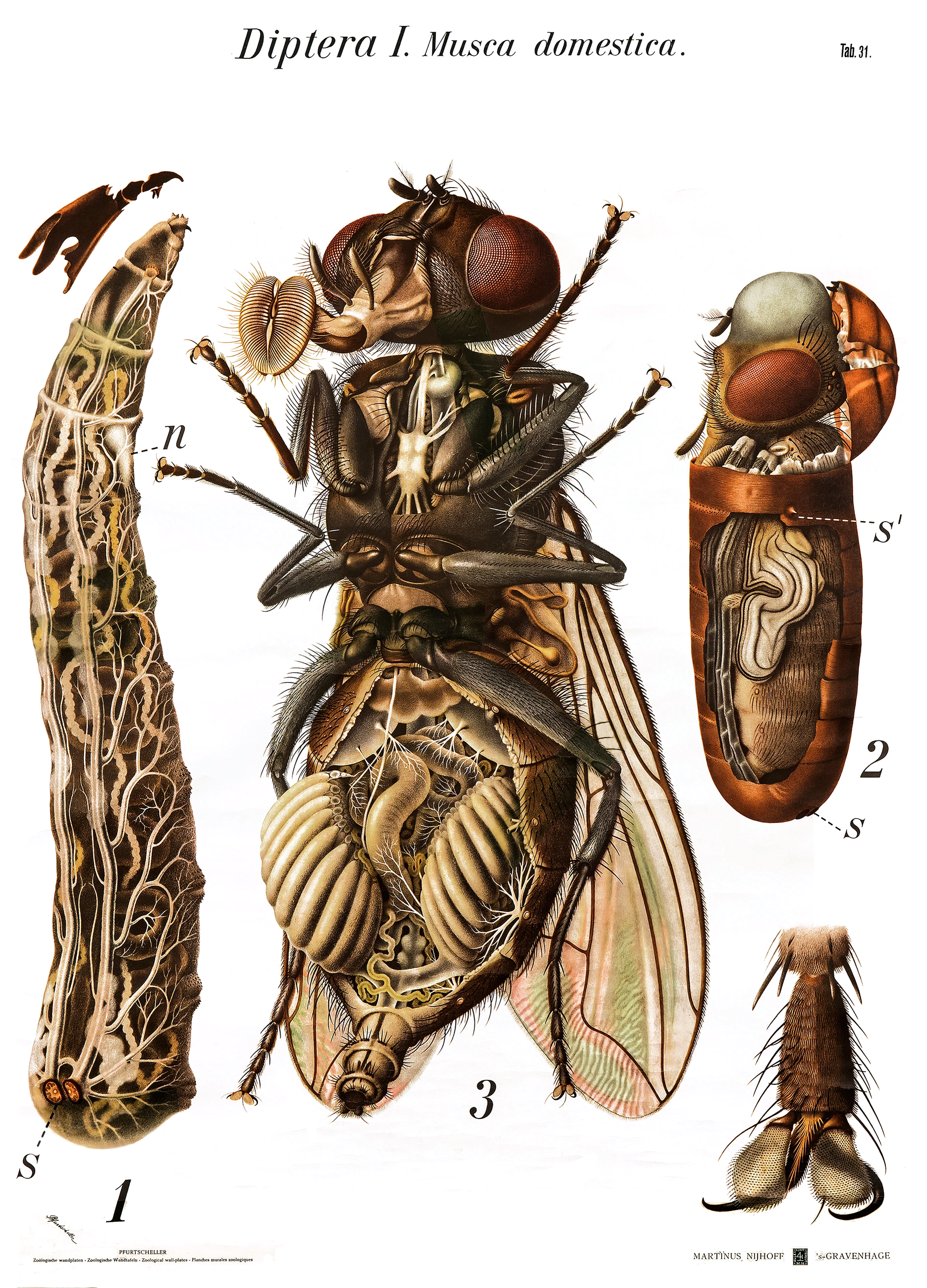
31

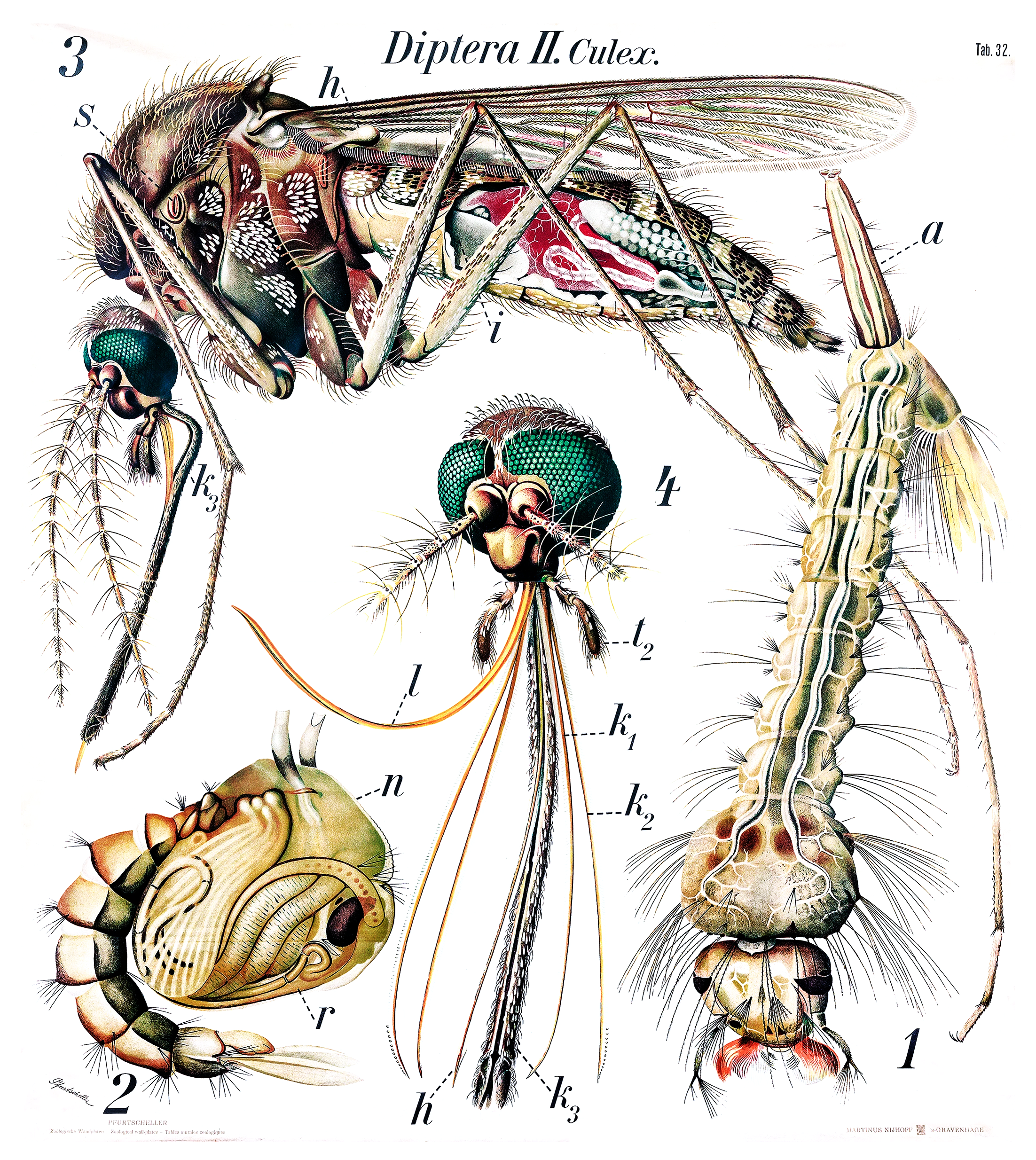
32

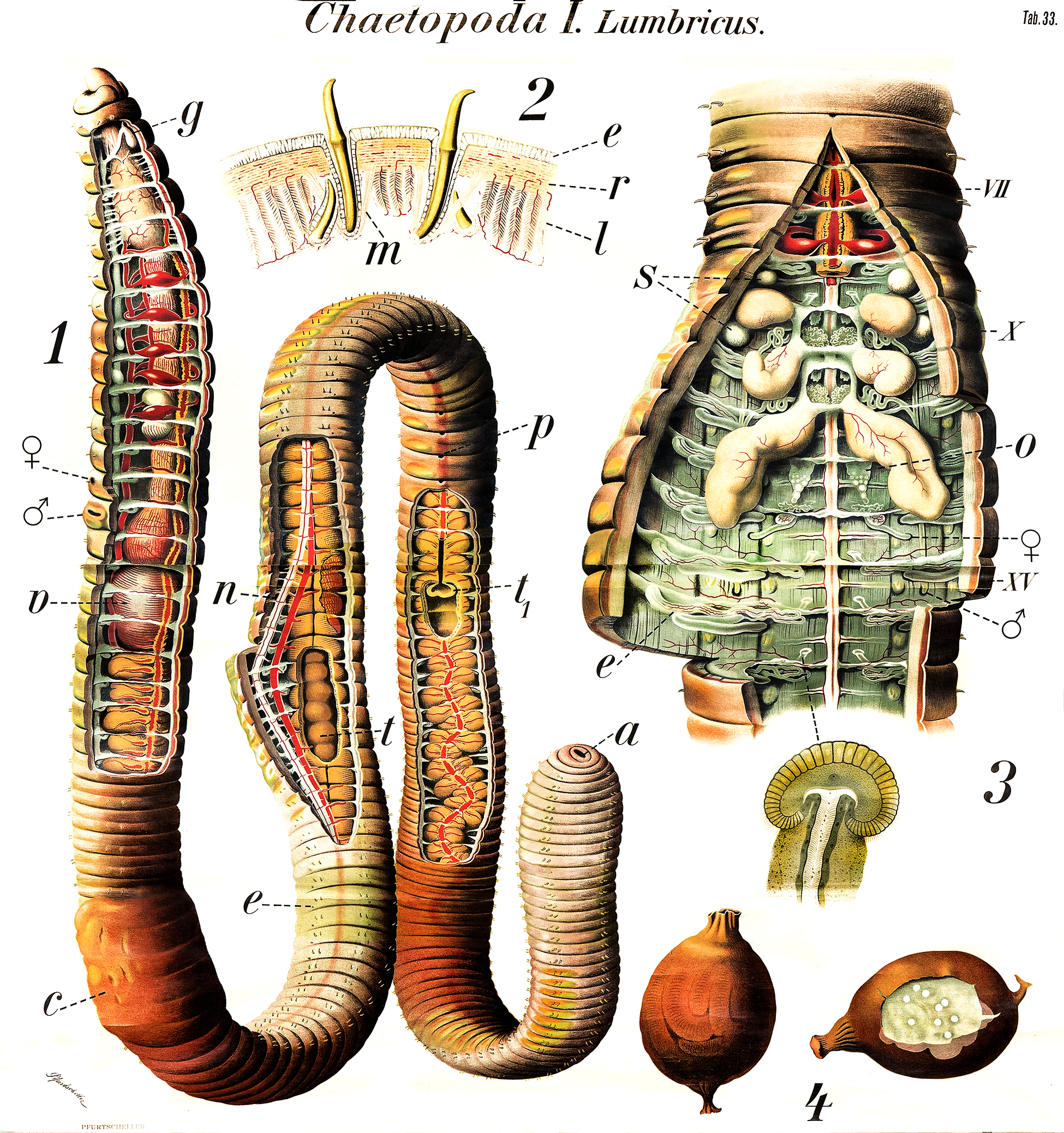
33

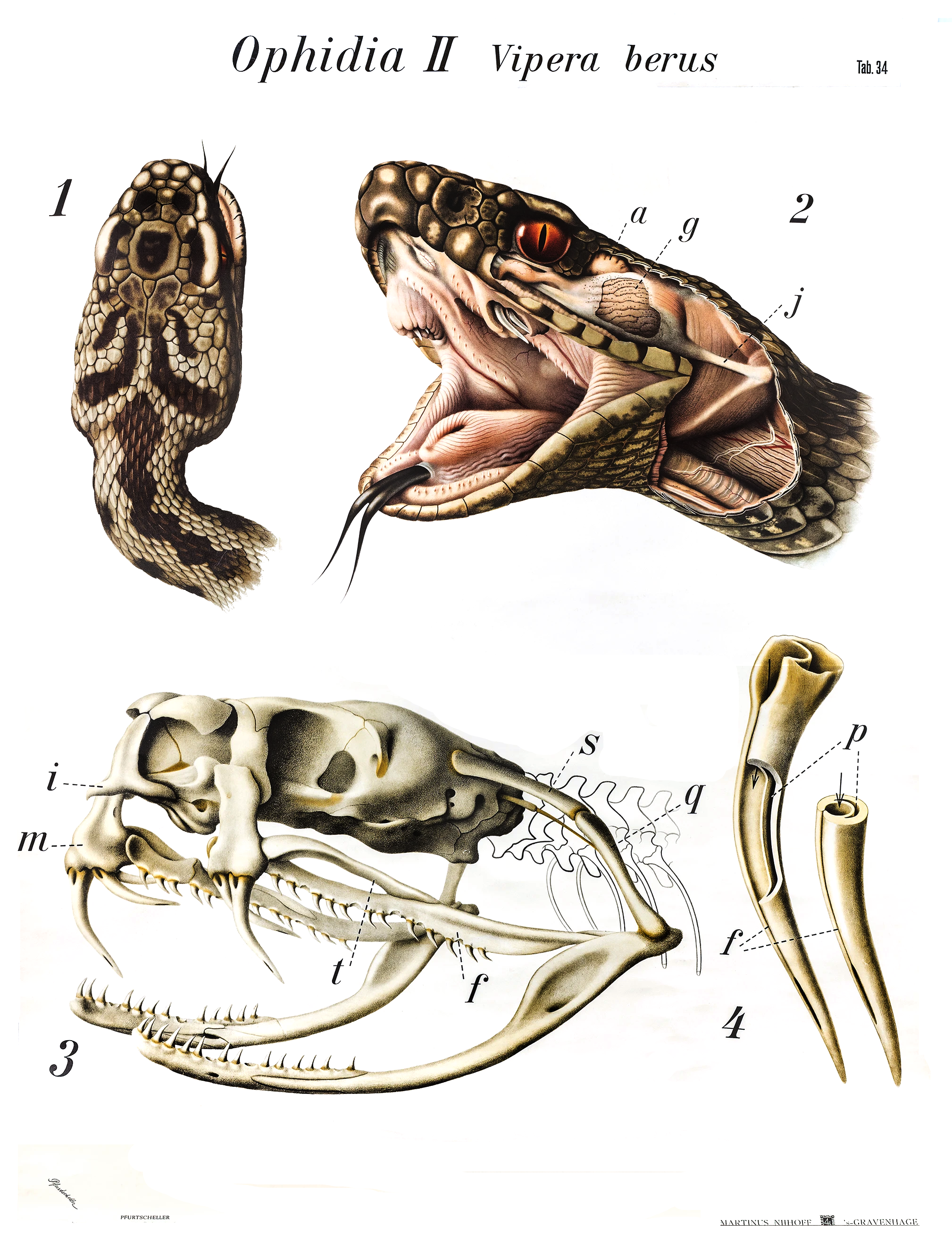
34

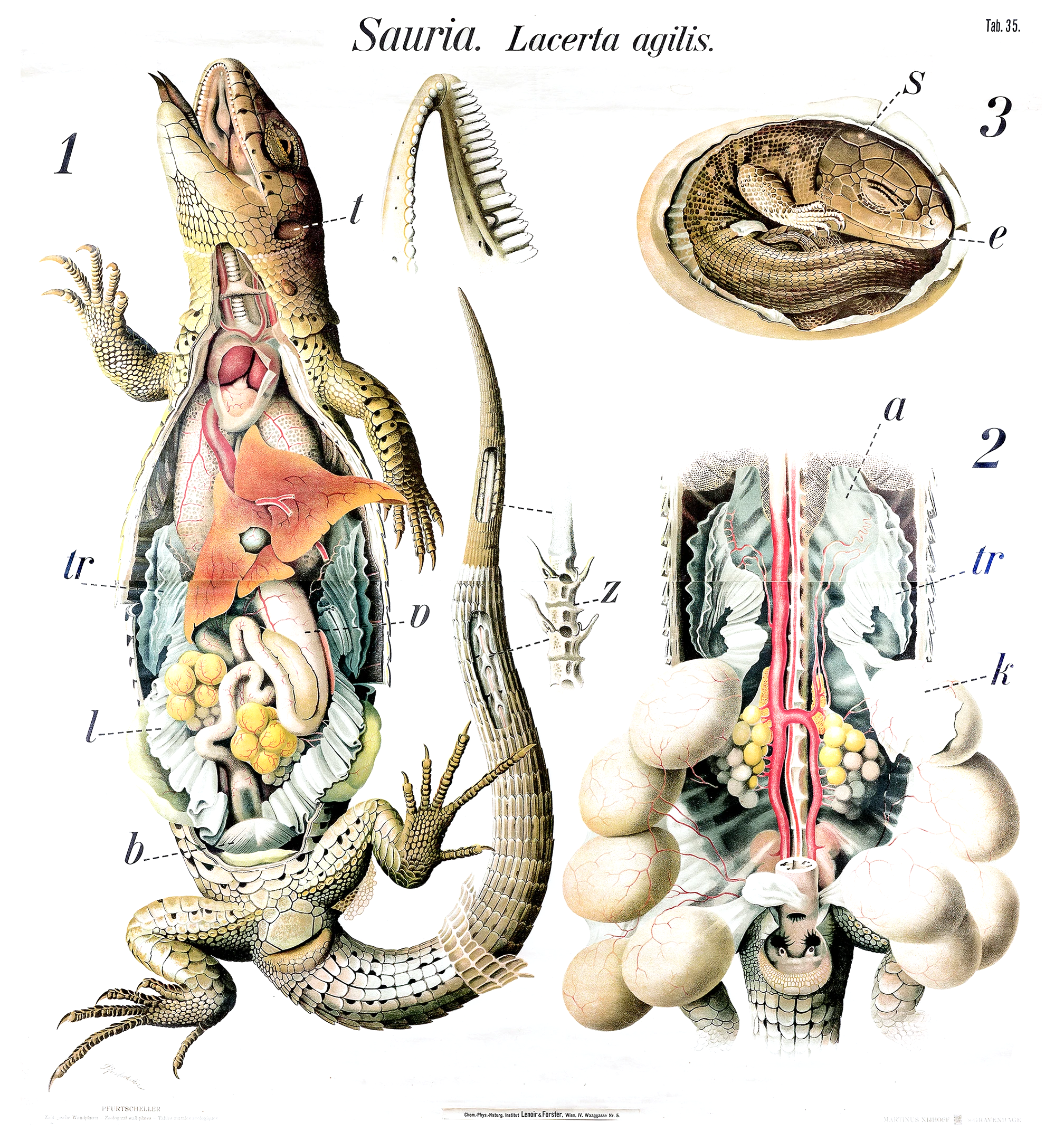
35

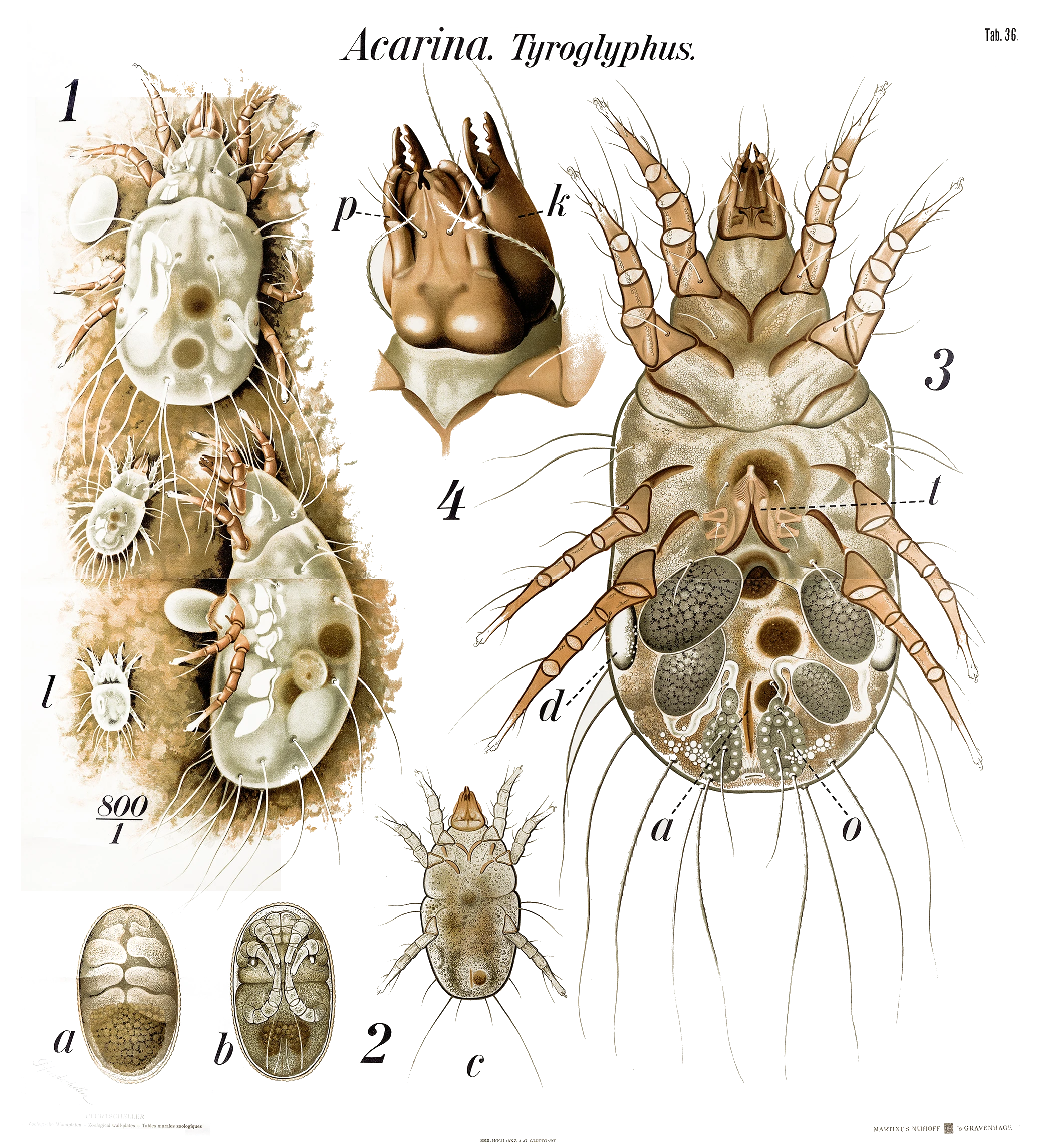
36

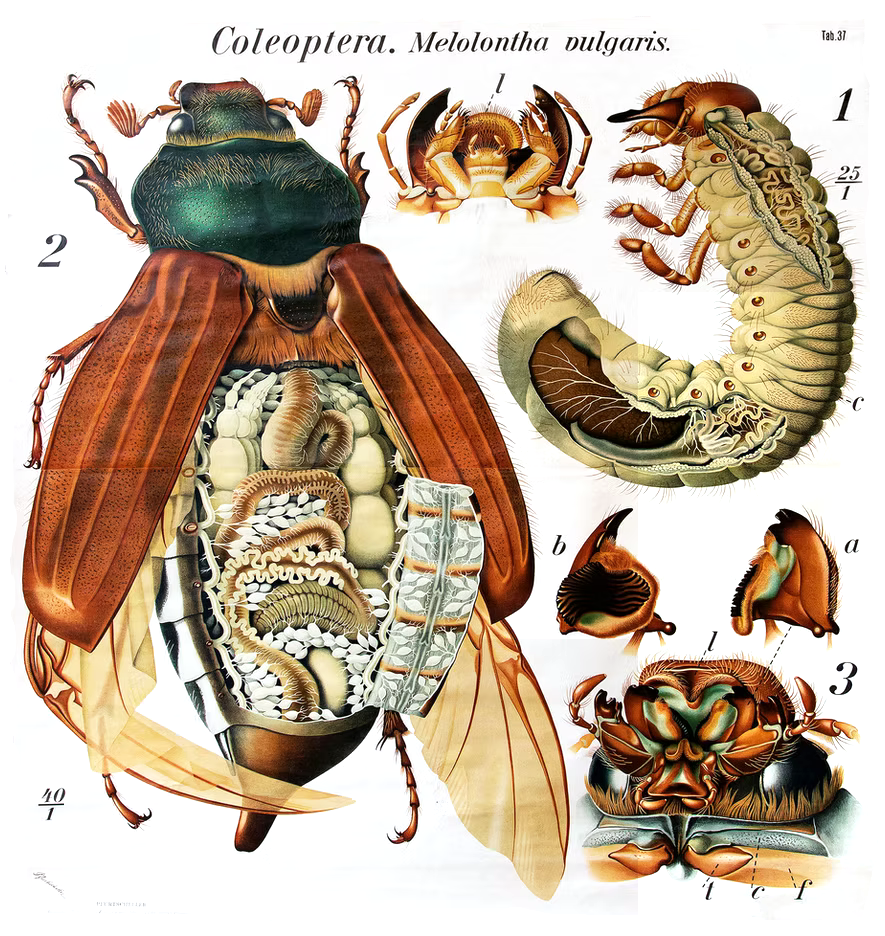
37

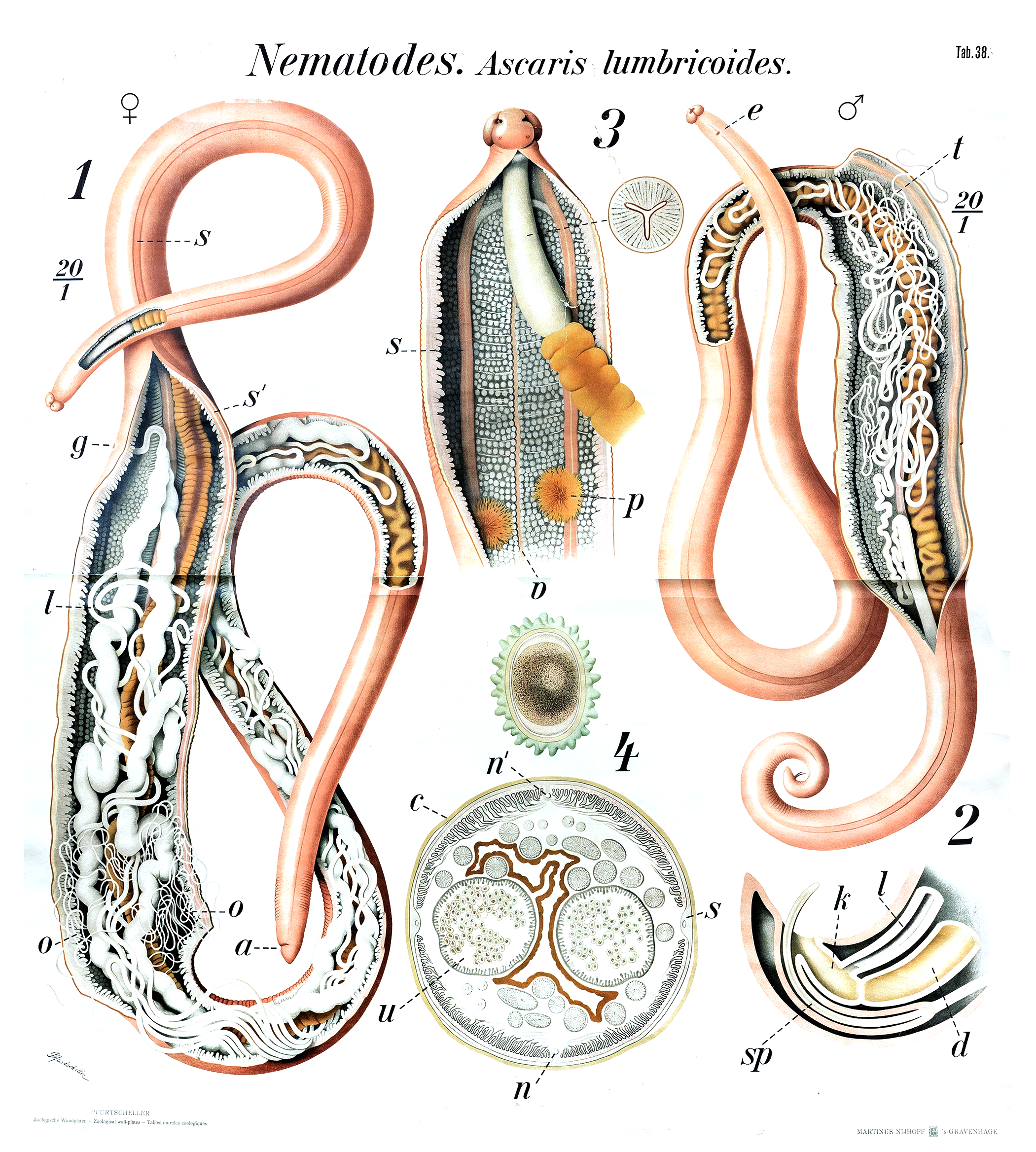
38

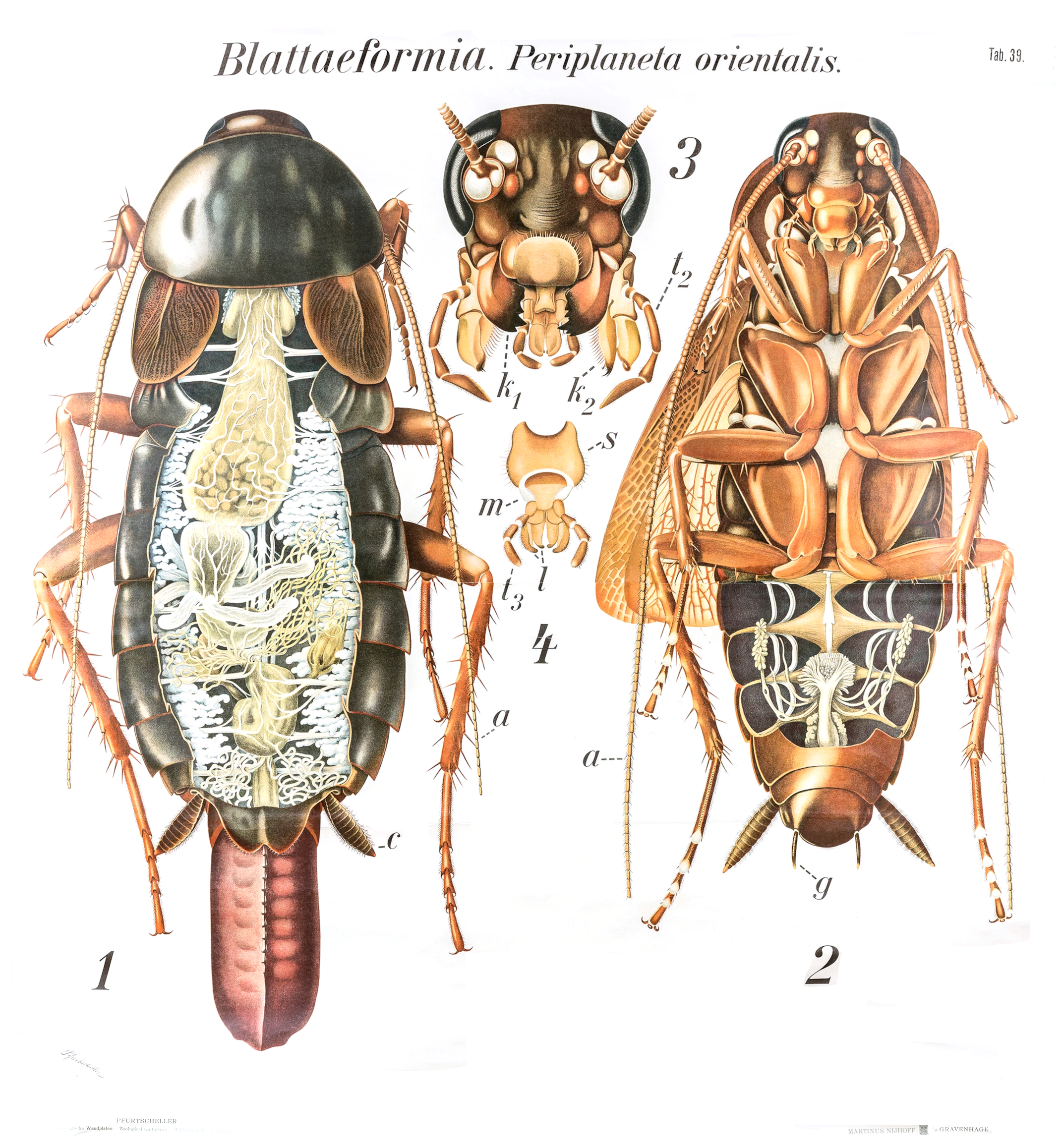
39

== See also ==
- Hermann Zippel
- Jung-Koch-Quentell Wall Charts
- Clotilde von Wyss
