= Gottlieb von Koch =

German zoologist

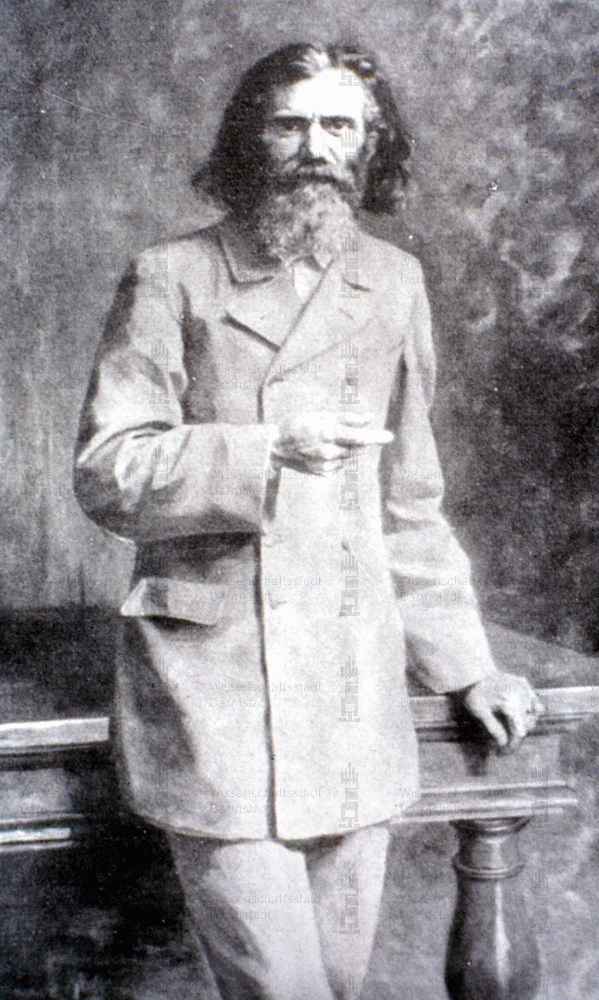
- Born: Gottlieb Karl David von Koch; 15 October 1849; Hirschberg, Thuringia
- Died: 21 November 1914 (aged 65); Alsbach
- Education: Trade school in Hof, Bavaria, study of mechanical engineering and zoology at the Polytechnikum Nuremberg, study of ancient languages in Nuremberg and Hirschberg, studies in Heidelberg and Jena, medicine and natural sciences; doctorate in philosophy at Jena university, topic "Anatomie der Orgelkoralle Tubipora hemprichi" (the anatomy of organ coral t. hemprichi).
- Known for: Jung-Koch-Quentell Wall Charts, Hessisches Landesmuseum Darmstadt
- Spouse(s): Elise von Koch, born Jäger
- Awards: Knight's Cross I. class of the Order of Merits Philip the Magnanimous (Ritterkreuz I. Klasse des Verdienstordens Philipps des Großmütigen), Imperial Russian Order St. Stanislaus II. class (Kaiserlich Russischer St. Stanislausordens II. Klasse)

Gottlieb Karl David von Koch (15 October 1849 – 21 November 1914) was a zoologist, painter, sculptor, and museum curator. He served as a professor of zoology at the technical school in Darmstadt. He published on octocorals and the species Eunicella kochi was named after him. He was involved in the construction of the Hessische Landesmuseum building opened in 1906 and was the scientific designer of Darmstadt's zoological dioramas. He is also known for his work on the Jung-Koch-Quentell Wall Charts.

== Life and work ==
Born 15 October 1849 in Hirschberg, Thuringia, the son of a factory owner, he was educated by private tutors and at school at Ebersdorf until 1864. After attending a trade school in Hof, Bavaria from 1864–1866, he studied mechanical engineering and zoology at the Polytechnikum Nuremberg from 1867–1870. There he lived in the former house of engraver and botanist Jacob Sturm and was inspired to study biology by Sturm's natural history collections.

After leaving the Polytechnikum in 1868, he studied ancient languages in Nuremberg and Hirschberg till 1869.

From 1870 to 1872, he studied medicine and natural sciences in Heidelberg and Jena. He earned his doctorate in philosophy in Jena on 26 July 1872 with the topic "Anatomie der Orgelkoralle Tubipora hemprichi" (the anatomy of organ coral T. hemprichi.) While at the university in Jena, he worked as assistant to Ernst Haeckel. In 1873 he did scientific work in Naples and Messina, at the Stazione Zoologica Anton Dohrn. Anton Dohrn offered him an assistant position which he declined. On 16 December 1874, he earned his Magister grade in Jena and habilitated there.

From 3 May 1875, he was appointed inspector of the Natural History Cabinet in Darmstadt and began lectureship in zoology at the Polytechnikum Darmstadt. After the Polytechnikum became the Technische Hochschule, he was appointed as professor on 18 October 1877. In 1880, he became founding member of the Darmstadt Association for Natural Sciences (Naturwissenschaftlicher Verein zu Darmstadt). He was member of this association's board from 1892 to 1897. In addition to his teaching positions, he became the zoological curator of the Landesmuseum on 20.12.1890, which succeeded the Natural history Cabinet.

During his Darmstadt years, he visited the Stazione Zoologica Anton Dohrn (1891 Description of Cereopsis studeri Koch) again, visited artist and museums, and worked in sculptor Adolf von Hildebrand's atelier in Florence, visiting Carrara to select marble for his own works. He published Die Gorgoniden des Golfes von Neapel (1887).

Starting in 1892, he published a series of educational wall charts, together with teacher Heinrich Jung and Dr Friedrich Quentell.

He was involved in planning the Hessisches Landesmuseum Darmstadt, which opened in 1906 and resigned from his teaching duties in 1905. Here he pioneered the idea of zoological dioramas for exhibiting taxidermy specimens. Instead of having specimens in cabinets, he had them arranged against a backdrop with natural-looking environment. Groups of animals forming zoogeographic associations were placed together. Many of these dioramas were damaged in World War II.

Gottlieb von Koch died 1914, Alsbach, Germany.

The bird species Mindanao cuckooshrike (Coracina striata kochi) and Whiskered Pitta (Erythropitta kochi) are named after von Koch.

== Publications ==
Some of his publications include:

- 1869 – Ornithologische Notizen aus dem Jahre 1869 (ornithological notes of the year 1869)
- 1871 – Synopsis der Vögel Deutschlands : kurze Beschreibung aller in Deutschland vorkommenden Arten (Synopsis of Germany's birds : short description of all species present in Germany).
- Briefliches von den Moorweihern bei Erlangen (Letters from the moor ponds near Erlangen)
- Die Stellungen der Vögel : für Präparatoren, Ausstopfer und Freunde der Vögel (The poses of birds : for taxidermists and friends of birds)
- 1873 – Bemerkungen über das Halten von niederen Seethieren (Remarks on the keeping of lower sea animals)
- 1874 – Grundriss der Zoologie (Basics of zoology)
- 1877 Mittheilungen über Cölenteraten (Notes on coelenterates).
- 1878 – Aufstellung der Spirituspräparate (Presentation of spirit preparations)
- 1880 Beschreibung eines Apparats zur Entfettung von Knochen (Description of an apparatus for the de-greasing of bones)
- 1882 – Über die Entwicklung des Kalkskeletts von Asteroides calycularis (On the development of the calcareous skeleton of Asteroides calycularis)
- Anatomie der Clavularia prolifera n. sp. nebst einigen vergleichenden Bemerkungen (Anatomy of Clavularia prolifera n. sp. with some comparing remarks)
- 1884 – Verfahren um Cement für stereochromatische Bemalung tauglich zu machen (Process to make cement suitable for stereochromatic painting); imperial patent nr 29670.
- 1886 – Untersuchung über das Wachsthum von Antipathes (Study on the growth of Antipathes)
- 1887 – Die Gorgoniden des Golfes von Neapel und der angrenzenden Meeresabschnitte (The gorgonides of the Gulf of Naples and adjacent sea sections).
- 1888 – Über Flabellum (On Flabellum)
- 1890 – Über Krügeners Taschenbuch-Camera (On Krügener's pocket book camera)
- 1892 – Über naturgeschichtliche Sammlungen (On natural history collections)

== Personal life ==
In summer 1879, Gottlieb von Koch married his wife Elise. As the marriage remained child-less, the couple opened up their house for children of the neighborhood to let them play there. He published several books with children's stories and songs. In 1909, he founded an association for the "performance of von Koch's children's games"(Verein zur Ausführung der G. v. Koch'schen Kinderspiele).

He bequeathed his house to the city of Darmstadt under the condition it would be used for child care. As of 2025, the house is used by the communal Day Care Center Koch'sches Haus.
