= Jung-Koch-Quentell Wall Charts =

Botanical and zoological wall charts for use in schools

Jung–Koch–Quentell wall chart showing details of Cardamine pratensis

Jung–Koch–Quentell wall charts (abbreviated as JKQ) are a series of educational wall charts for teaching biology and zoology created by Heinrich Jung (1856–1939), Gottlieb von Koch (1849–1914) and Friedrich Quentell (1847–1935). They collaborated on a series of wall charts which were published as Neuen Wandtafeln für den Unterricht in der Naturgeschichte by Frommann and Morian of Darmstadt who went out of business after World War II. The rights were then obtained by Wilhelm and Marie Hagemann and it was republished by Hagemann Company of Düsseldorf. The illustrations were often geometrically stylized and idealized in the style of Ernst Haeckel who was an influence on Von Koch. These charts are now collectors items.

== Development and use ==
The Jung-Koch-Quentell’schen Lehrtafeln/Wandtafeln – originally created between 1892 and 1921– "were used in lectures at university and schools until the late twentieth century" and were re-issued several times, up until 2015.

wall chart showing details of claviceps purpurea

The design of the charts followed twelve guidelines outlined in the accompanying booklet. The selected species for illustration were chosen with reference to the textbooks, ensuring that they represent the entire organism and highlight the most important parts relevant to the lesson. It was meant to be used by the teacher and no text was added to the charts themselves. Each plates represented a single species with details of parts and the backgrounds were often black to maintain focus on the objects. The illustrations often had the details simplified and often made more geometric, idealized, and aesthetic.

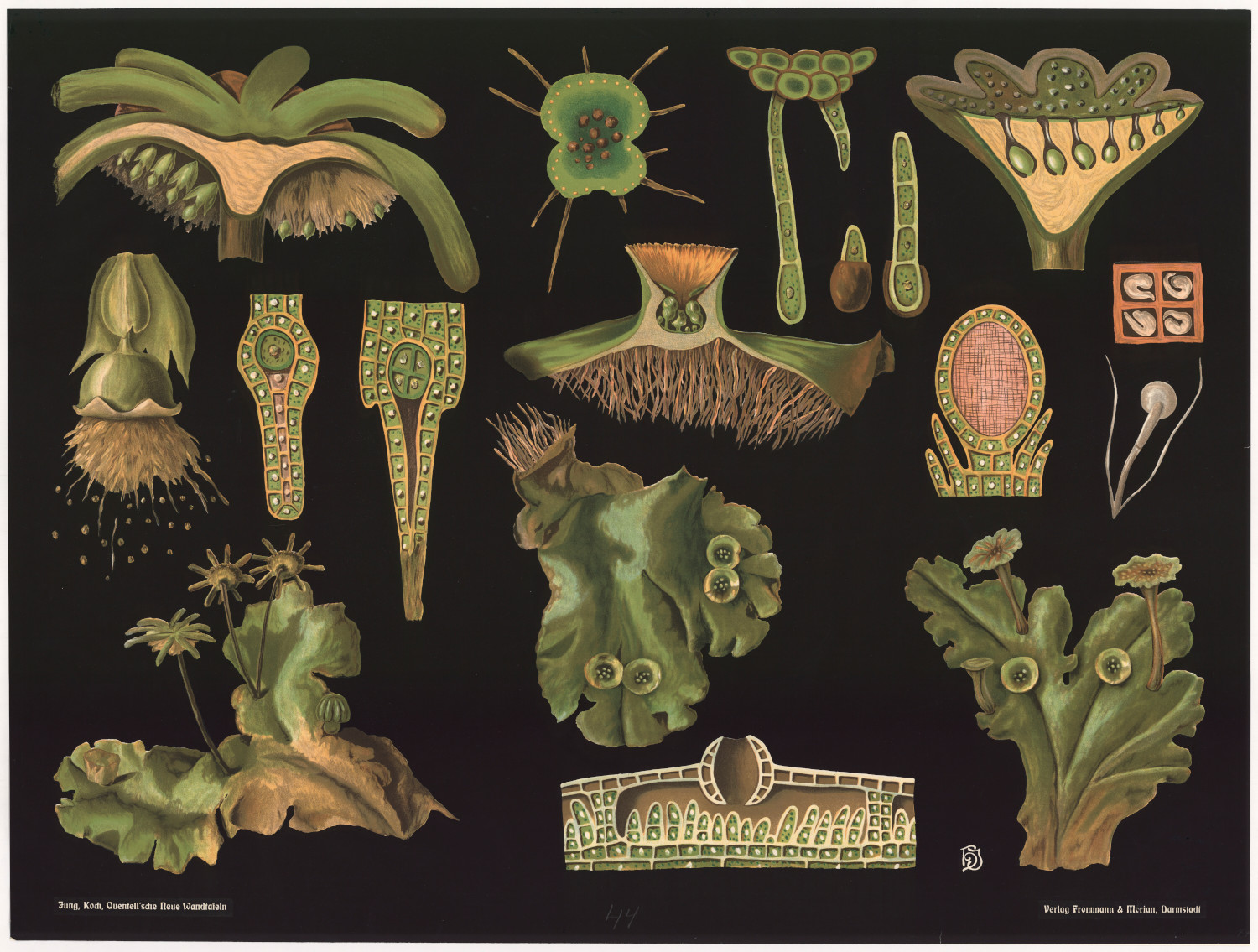
wall chart showing details of hepatics / marchantiophyta

The charts were painted by Heinrich Jung, a teacher, with the support of Gottlieb von Koch, a zoology professor and natural history museum curator, and Friedrich Quentell, a teachers' seminary director. The charts were initially published by Frommann & Morian (1847–1930) of Darmstadt, who originally announced to sell them in 6 shipments of 10 sheets each. Each sheet had the dimensions of 100 by 75 cm of which 30 sheets were botanical and 30 dealt with zoological subjects. They were supplemented by an accompanying booklet.

Fromman & Morian was sold to a competitor in 1930, but continued to operate until ca 1940. The original paintings and lithographic plates were lost in World War II. The charts were re-published by Hagemann Lehrmittelverlag in Düsseldorf in the 1950s and 1960s. Carl Morian was involved in this re-creation, supported by Dr Georg Heldmann, the successor of Gottlieb von Koch as curator of the zoology department of the Hessisches Landesmuseum Darmstadt. The new edition format was increased to 86x114 cm, and parts of the objects were now placed on a 'natural' background. The artists who drew these new background are not known.

Shortly after their first publication, the charts were recommended by the Prussian educational authorities. After this official endorsement, many schools in Prussia and its provinces procured them.

== List of the charts ==
The following list is taken from the 1903's booklet, with additions from the 1928's booklet. The original spelling is used, which differs sometimes from current day use.

Botany
Nr	Batch 1		Batch 2		Batch 3		Batch 4		Batch 5		Batch 6
1	Primula officinalis. Schlüsselblume.	11	Salix caprea. Sahlweide.	21	Vitis vinifera. Weinstock.	31	Cuscuta epithymum. Kleeseide.	41	Iris germanica. Schwertlilie.	51	Prunus avium. Süßkirschbaum.
2	Pisum sativum. Erbse.	12	Tulipa gesneriana. Gartentulpe.	22	Corylus avellana. Hasel.	32	Lotus corniculatus. Gehörnter Schotenklee.	42	Zea mais. Mais.	52	Colchicum autumnale. Herbstzeitlose.
3	Aesculus hippocastanum. Roßkastanie.	13	Pirus communis. Birnbaum.	23	Orchis morio. Knabenkraut.	33	Salvia pratensis. Salbei.	43	Equisetum arvense. Ackerschachtelhalm.	53	Arum maculatum. Aronstab.
4	Fragaria vesca. Walderdbeere.	14	Lamium album. Weiße Taubnessel.	24	Pinus silvestris. Kiefer.	34	Centaurea cyanus. Kornblume.	44	Marchantia polymorpha. Lebermoos.	54	
5	Cardamine pratensis. Wiesenschaumkraut.	15	Viola tricolor. Veilchen.	25	Polystichum filix mas. Schildfarn.	35	Linaria vulgaris. Leinkraut.	45	Lycopodium clavatum. Kolben-Bärlapp.	55	
6	Ranunculus acris. Scharfer Hahnenfuß.	16	Agrostemma githago. Kornrade.	26	Polytrichum commune. Großes Haarmoos.	36	Oenothera biennis. Nachtkerze.	46	Sphagnum acutifolium. Torfmoos.	56	
7	Papaver rhoeas. Klatschrose.	17	Viscum album. Mistel.	27	Agaricus campestris. Champignon.	37	Drosera rotundifolia. Sonnentau.	47	Urtica dioica. Große Brennessel.	57	
8	Solanum tuberosum. Kartoffel.	18	Tilia parvifolia. Kleinblättrige Linde.	28	Physcia parietina. Wand-Schwielenflechte.	38	Echium vulgare. Natterkopf.	48	Hedera helix. Efeu.	58	
9	Convolvulus arvensis. Ackerwinde.	19	Daucus carota. Möhre	29	Mucor mucedo. Kopfschimmel.	39	Claviceps purpurea. Mutterkornpilz.	49	Galanthus nivalis. Schneeglöckchen.	59	
10	Secale cereale. Roggen.	20	Helianthus annuus. Sonnenblume	30	Spirogyra, Pinnularia, Vaucheria Süßwasseralgen	40	Saccharomyces cerevisiae. Bierhefepilz.	50	Fucus vesiculosus. Blasentang.	60	

Zoology
Nr	Batch 1		Batch 2		Batch 3		Batch 4
1	Felis domestica. Hauskatze	11	Anser cinereus. Hausgans	21	Triton cristatus. Kamm-Molch.	31	Erinaceus europaeus. Igel.
2	Ovis aries. Schaf	12	Pelias berus, Coluber natrix. Kreuzotter, Ringelnatter.	22	Cyprinus Carpio. Gemeiner Karpfen.	32	Trichina spiralis. Trichine.
3	Lepus timidus. Hase	13	Emys europaea. Europäische Sumpfschildkröte.	23	Musca domestica. Stubenfliege.	33	Hirudo medicinalis. Blutegel.
4	Fringilla coelebs. Buchfink	14	Anadonta anatina. Kleine Teichmuschel.	24	Gryllotalpa vulgaris. Maulwurfsgrille	34	Sepia officinalis. Tintenfisch (Mittelmeer)
5	Lacerta agilis. Eidechse	15	Apis mellifica. Biene.	25	Cyclops Argulus. Ruderfüssler.	35	Scyllum catulus. Katzenhai.
6	Perca fluviatilis. Barsch	16	Pieris Brassicae I. Kohlweissling I.	26	Asteropecten aurantiacus. Seestern.	36	Manteltiere, Tunicata. Ascidiae simplices, Einfache Ascidien, Seescheiden.
7	Rana muta. Grasfrosch	17	Pieris Brassicae. Kohlweissling II.	27	Taenia solium. Bandwurm.	37	Gallus domesticus. Huhn.
8	Helix pomatia. Weinbergschnecke	18	Astacus fluviatilis. Flusskrebs.	28	Asteroides calycularis. Sternkoralle.	38	Spongilla a)Ephydatia fluviatilis, b)Spongilla lacustris. Süßwasserschwamm
9	Melolontha vulgaris. Maikäfer	19	Lumbricus agricola. Regenwurm.	29	Vorticella. Paramecium. Stylonichia, Euglena, Noctiluca. Infusorien.	39	Aurelia aurita. Ohrenqualle.
10	Epeira diadema. Kreuzspinne	20	Hydra vulgaris. Gemeiner Süsswasserpolyp.	30	Amoeba, Rotalia, Difflugia, Gregarina. Urtiere.	40	

In 1928, Carl Morian and Heinrich Jung added two additional charts "Anatomie", showing a human skeleton from the side and in frontal view.

== Biographies of the creators ==
Heinrich Jung
- Born: Heinrich Jung; 19.6.1856; Wöllstein
- Died: 3 November 1939 (aged 83)
- Education: Teacher seminary
- Spouse: Katharina Maria Louise Noack
- Awards: Silberne Verdienstmedaille für Kunst und Wissenschaft (Silver order of merit for art and sciences)

Heinrich Jung (19 June 1856, Wöllstein – 3 November 1939, Darmstadt) became a teacher at the Stadtknabenschule Darmstadt (boys' school) in 1878. He was a founding member of the association for natural sciences in Darmstadt (Naturwissenschaftlicher Verein zu Darmstadt), which was co-found by Gottlieb von Koch on 21 August 1880. He taught at the Mädchenmittelschule (girls' secondary school, as of 2025: Goetheschule) in Darmstadt from 26 June 1886 until he retired on 1 February 1924. He married Katharina Maria Louise Noack on 20 October 1886 and they had three children - Heinz Jung, Gustav Jung and Thilde Jung.

Gottlieb von Koch (1849 – 1914) was an artist as well as a biologist and had worked with Ernst Haeckel whose works likely influenced the idealization of the art work in the charts. He designed the zoological dioramas at the Darmstadt Museum.

Friedrich Quentell
- Born: Friedrich Quentell; 26 April 1847; Worms
- Died: 20 March 1935 (aged 87)
- Education: 1858 – 1866 Gymnasium in Worms, study of mathematics, chemistry, and physics in Heidelberg, Bonn and Gießen, doctorate in Gießen (1871)
- Spouse(s): Jula Quentell, born Euler (from 1876 to 1914); Clara Quentell, born Buchenau (from 1916 to 1935)
- Awards: Ritterkreuz I. Klasse des Verdienstordens Philipps des Großmüthigen (25.11.1900, Knight's Cross I Class of the Order of Merit of Philip the Magnanimous)

Friedrich Eduard Quentell (26 April 1847, Worms –20 March 1935, Homberg/Ohm) studied at the Gymnasium in Worms from 1866 and before going to Heidelberg, Bonn, and Gießen. In Heidelberg, he studied mathematics, chemistry and physics under Rummer, Robert Bunsen and Gustav Kirchhoff. In Gießen, he worked with botanist Hermann Hoffmann and attended lessons of Rudolf Leuckart, who created zoological wall charts between 1877 and 1892.

In 1873, he transferred to Mainz and published a paper with Hermann Hoffmann "Die Diatomeen von Gießen" (the diatomes of Gießen). In 1874, he became teacher at the Realschule (secondary school) in his home town Worms. During this time, he was chairman of the Worms gymnastics teachers' association.

In 1887 he became member of a commission to investigate suspected phylloxera infestations along the Rhine between Worms and Ingelheim. While in Worms (and later in Michelstadt), he also gave public lectures for wine growers on this topic. Supported by a recommendation of Gottlieb von Koch, Quentell could work at the Stazione Zoologica Anton Dohrn between 2 April 1889 and 3 June 1889. He was made headmaster of the Realschule (secondary school) Michelstadt in 1890, where he taught physics, chemistry, geography, and natural history. In 1893, he became headmaster of the teacher training college (Schullehrer-Seminar) in Friedberg, teaching pedagogics and about teaching aids. After his early retirement for health reasons in 1902, he remained active in several associations. Quentell was member of the alpine club section Gießen. On 12 May 1908, he became co-founder and board member of the non-profit society for light, air and sun baths in Giessen ("Gemeinnützige Gesellschaft für Licht= Luft= und Sonnenbäder zu Gießen").

He was elected Bundesleiter (federal leader) of the Wandervogel, Deutscher Bund für Jugendwandern on 17 April 1908 and in 1910 he became an honorary Bundesleiter.

== See also ==
- Paul Pfurtscheller
- Clotilde von Wyss
