= Karl von Enhuber =

German painter

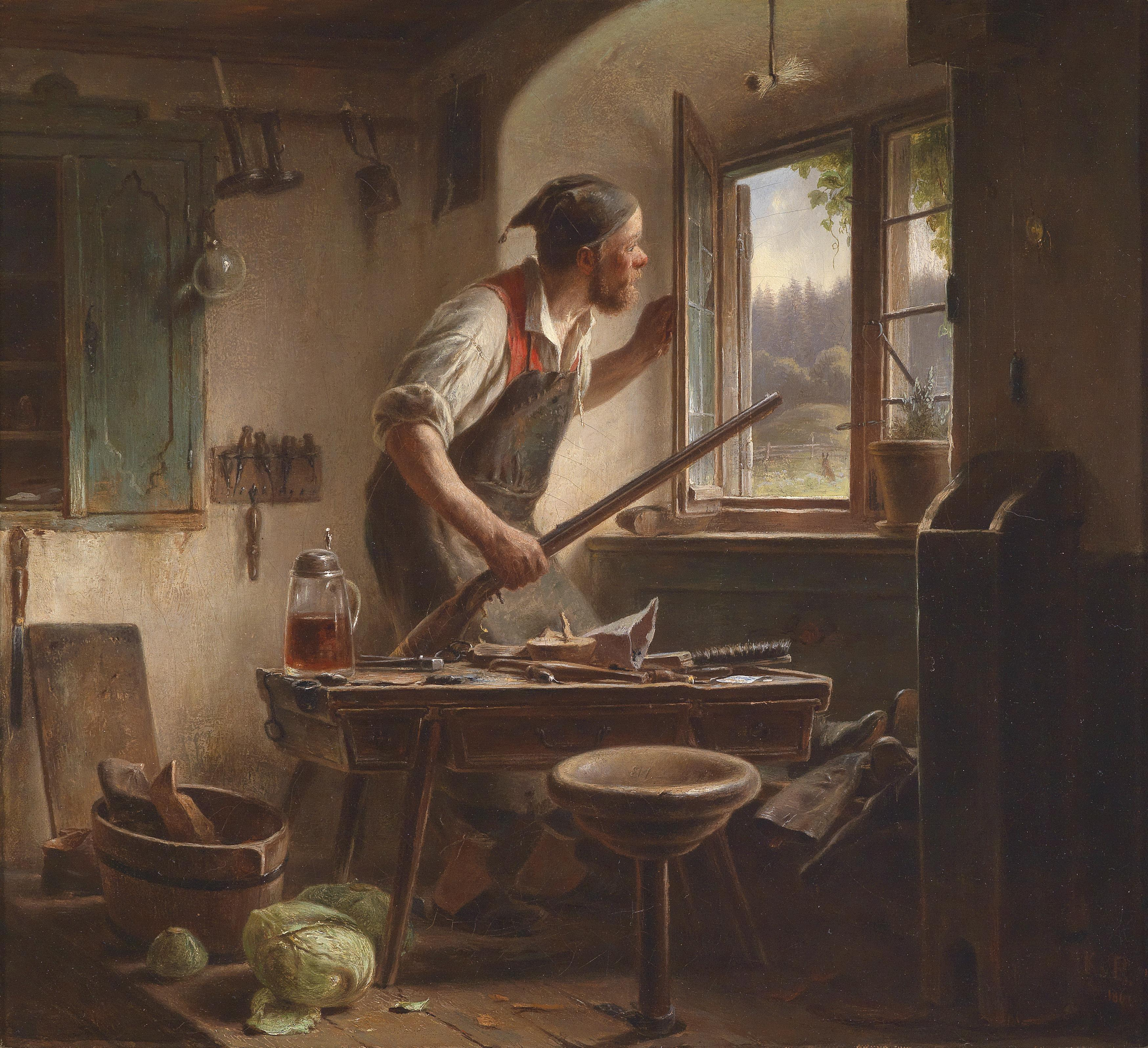
The vigilant cobbler, 1861

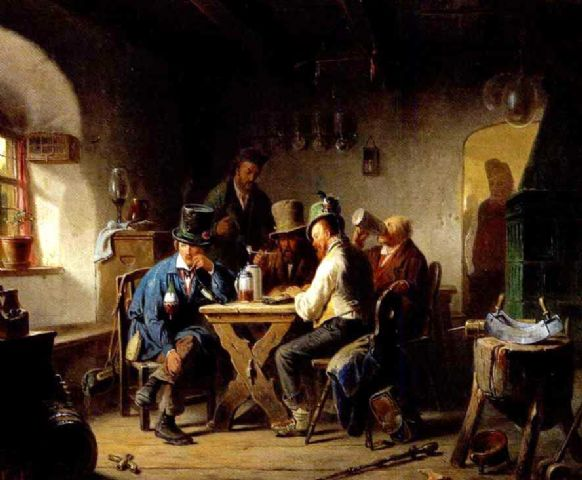
Homesickness, 1863

Karl von Enhuber (1811–1867), a genre painter, was born at Hof, in Voigtland. He was the son of a civil officer who, when his son was eighteen months old, moved to Nördlingen. After studying at the Munich Academy he was at first an animal painter. He then worked at representations of the Thirty Years' War and only through the study of the works of Metsu and Terborch did he discover his true talent. He was admitted a member of the Munich Academy in 1858, and died at Munich in 1867. He excelled in characterizing middle-class home life, with its pleasures and troubles, and had a natural sense of humour, which was the foundation of his delicate delineation of character. To be mentioned amongst his works are:

- Berlin. Gallery. Return of the Munich Guardsman. 1844.
- Darmstadt. Gallery. Sessions Day in Bavaria.
- Munich. Gallery. A Grandfather watching his Grandson at play with toy Soldiers and A Carver in his Workshop.
