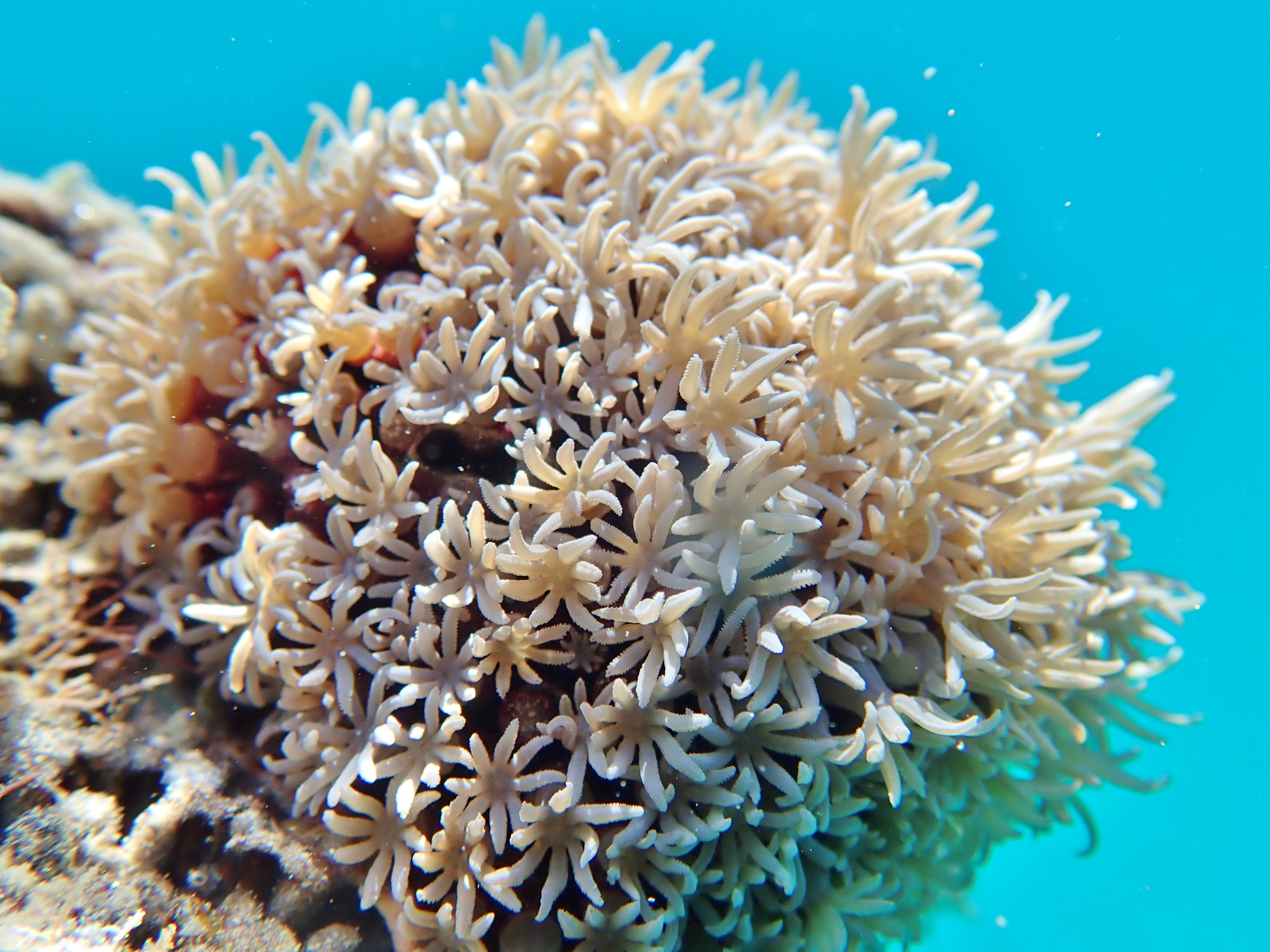
- Live organ pipe coral

Conservation status
- Least Concern (IUCN 3.1)

Scientific classification
- Kingdom: Animalia
- Phylum: Cnidaria
- Subphylum: Anthozoa
- Class: Octocorallia
- Order: Malacalcyonacea
- Family: Tubiporidae
- Genus: Tubipora
- Species: T. musica

Binomial name
- Tubipora musica Linnaeus, 1758

Synonyms
- Tubipora purpurea Pallas, 1766

= Organ pipe coral =

Species of coral

The organ pipe coral (Tubipora musica) is an alcyonarian octocoral native to the waters of the Indian Ocean and the central and western regions of the Pacific Ocean. It is the only known species of the genus Tubipora. This species is a soft coral but with a unique, hard skeleton of calcium carbonate that contains many organ pipe-like tubes. On each tube is a series of polyps which each have eight feather-like tentacles. These tentacles are usually extended during the day, but will swiftly withdraw with any sort of disturbance. The skeleton is a bright red color, but is typically obscured by numerous polyps. Because of this, living colonies are typically green, blue, or purple due to the color of the expanded polyps. Colonies are typically dome-shaped and can reach up to 3 meters (9.8 ft) across, while the individual polyps are typically less than 3 mm wide and a few mm long. They are close relatives to other soft coral and sea fans. This species is a popular aquarium coral due to its ease to maintain, as well as higher tolerance compared to most true corals. However, its popularity presents a problem: along with its potential as an aquarium coral, the species' coloration makes it a popular commodity for tourists, leading to a variety of threats to the population.

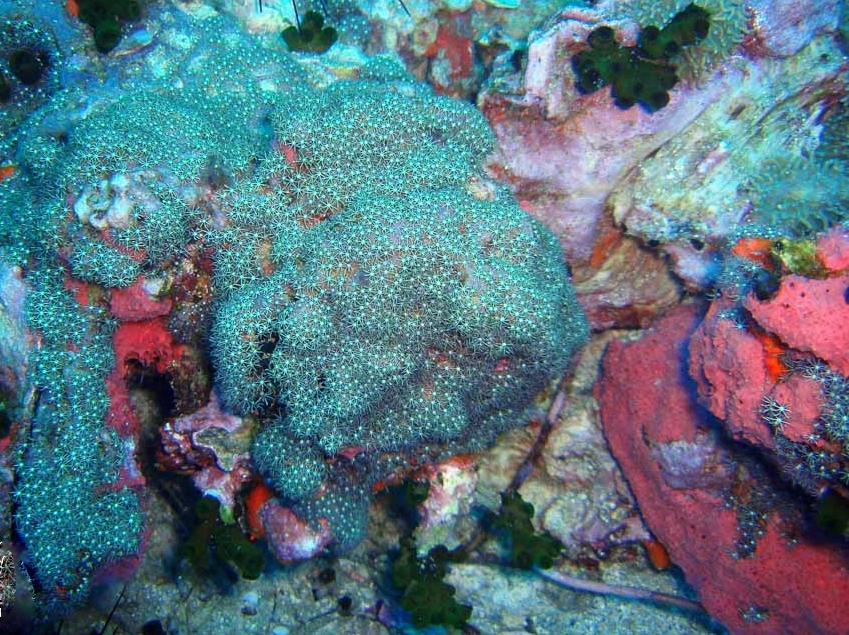
A living organ pipe coral colony

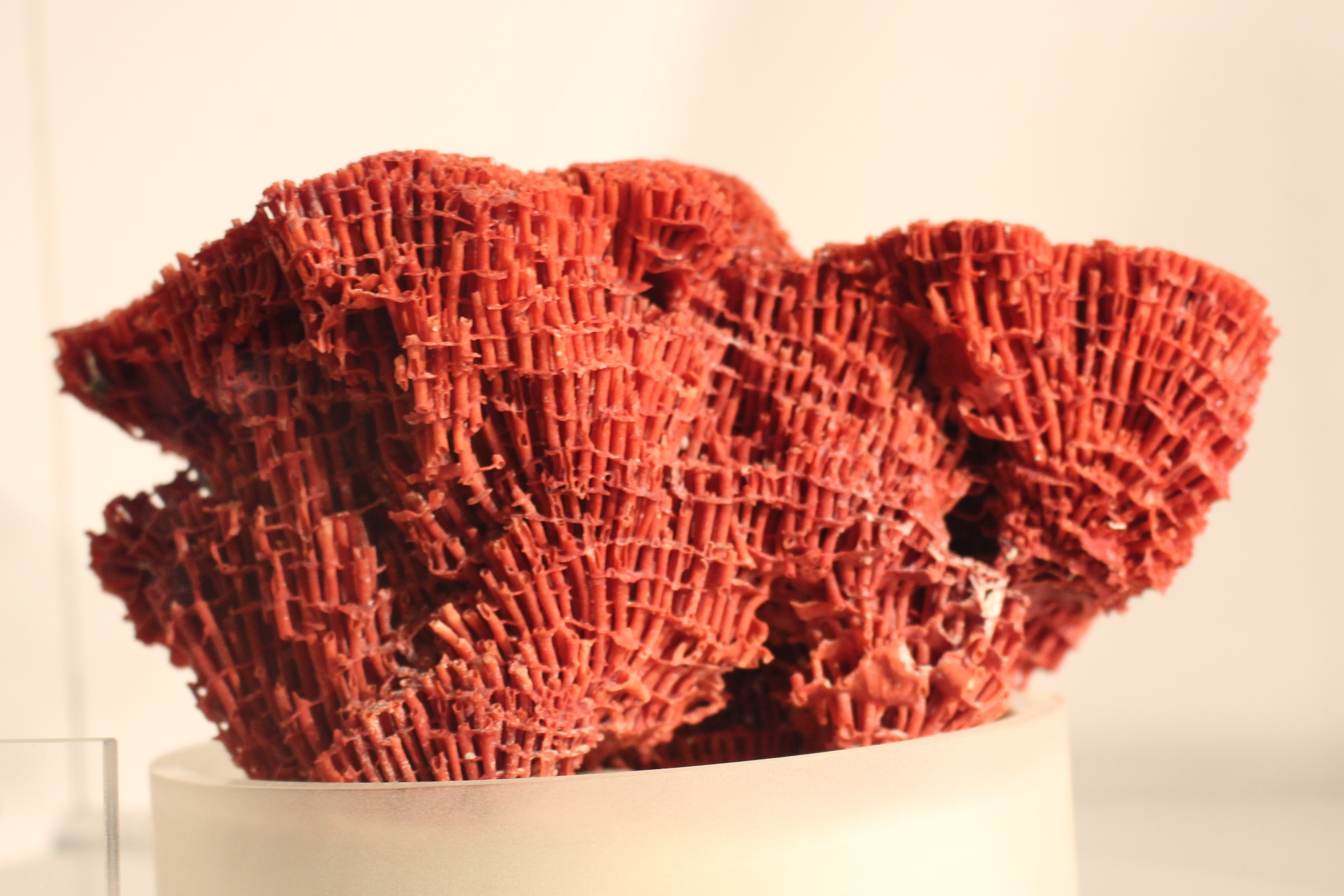
An organ pipe coral skeleton showing its interconnected pipe and tube structure

== Habitat ==
Organ pipe corals are restricted to shallow waters, and tend to live in sheltered areas where they eat plankton. Furthermore, it is usually found in habitats ranging from 2 to 20 m (6 ft 7 in to 65 ft 7 in) in depth. Notably, they have been found dominating bedrock and sandy grooves at 8 to 10 m, as well as mid-shelf reefs. They are also widely distributed, having been found in the west Pacific, south of Japan, west to Africa's East Coast, as well as throughout the Red Sea. The species prefers good, bright light conditions, as well as medium to strong water currents and well oxygenated water. To be successful, they also require sufficient alkalinity and calcium. Colonies of organ pipe corals are interconnected networks, consisting of many pipes and tubes joined together with parallel platforms. Furthermore, the colonies are usually composed of polyps that are all one color, although some large colonies have been found to have a mixture. When this occurs, there are usually obvious sections of specific colors in the colony; different colored polyps do not live interspersed with each other.

== Ecology ==
Organ pipe corals contain polyps that only live in the tops of the colony's tubes. These polyps contain zooxanthellae, which are a symbiotic type of phytoplankton that provide energy for the coral. Furthermore, the polyps also have eight feathery tentacles branching off, which are what give the colony its color. These tentacles allow the corals to capture both prey and organic particles from the surrounding environment. Although the species collects organic particles, also known as DOM (dissolved organic matter), the particles only meet 13% of the metabolic needs of the coral. The corals' skeleton is made of calcium carbonate, and is a deep red color. The coral is also known to interact with other animals, including two recently discovered copepods found in Madagascar.

=== Colonial behavior ===
Organ pipe corals exhibit limited colonial behavior. The main action that they can do is reacting as a unified colony when one part of the colony is disturbed. The corals exhibit a through-conducting response when disturbed, with a wave of activity sweeping across each part of a colony. When two or more polyps are touched, others nearby will bend away or retract completely. The corals usually keep activity involving one polyp separate from the rest of the colony, but disturbance of one polyp can still cause the entire colony to retract when necessary. When the polyps retract, they do so in a wave that spreads across the colony away from the place where the coral was disturbed. The corals have been shown to respond to both electrical and mechanical stimulation in this manner. However, colonial behavior beyond this response is likely limited because the corals only have one conduction system.

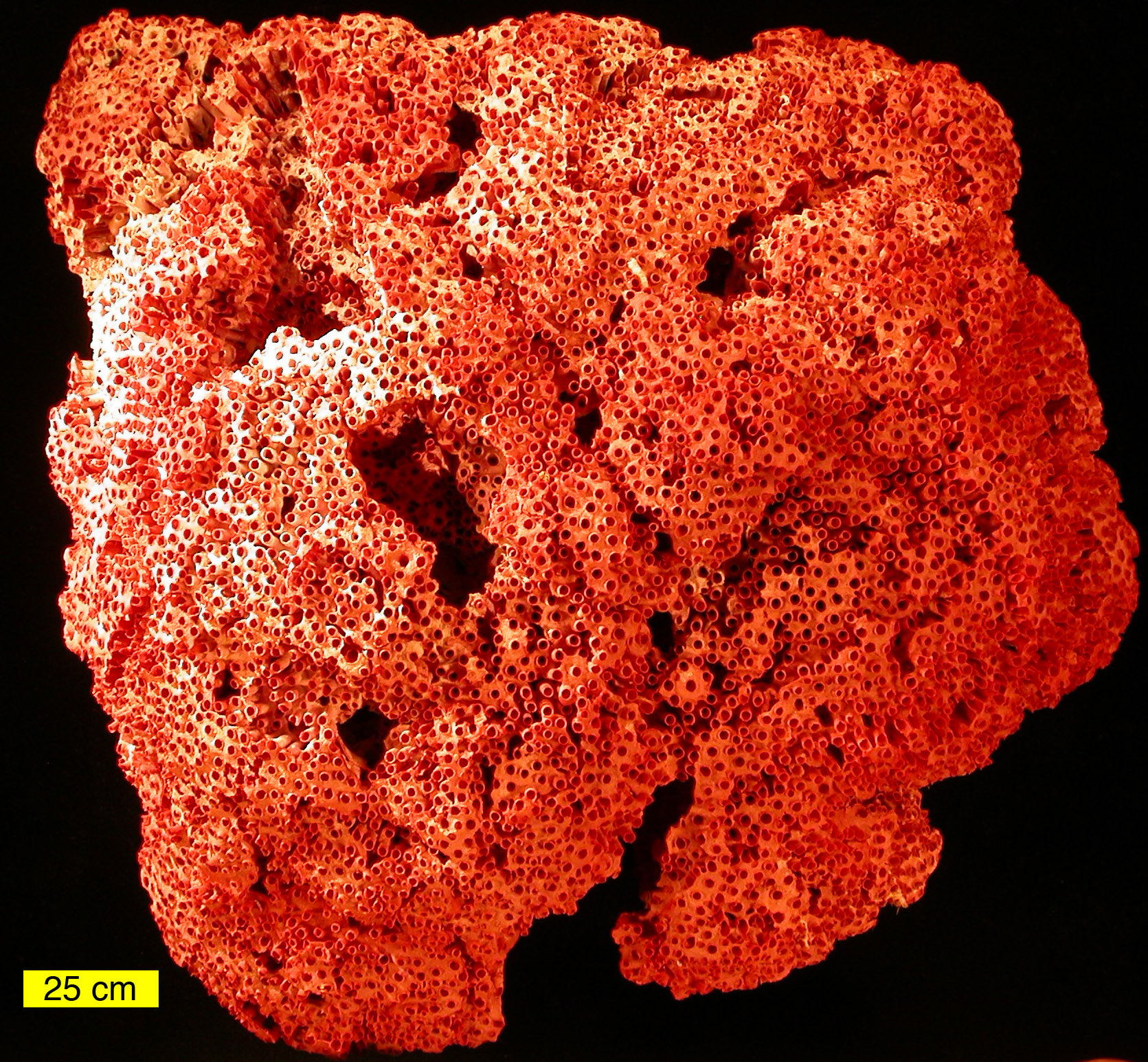
Full corallum of Tubipora musica

== Threats and human interaction ==
Organ pipe coral is listed as a near threatened species, with over 50% of the population being lost in the past 10 years. It has become popular with dealers, hobbyists, the medical community, and tourists over the years; this is because of its ability to be easily kept in aquariums, its high medical and scientific value, as well as its use in jewelry and other commodities. Due to its popularity, it is also illegally harvested and smuggled, with one report showing that it is one of the fifteen most traded corals in the world. Observed colonies frequently show signs of being harvested and collected, providing a visual example of how the population is under intense pressure from overharvesting. Subsequently, the most flourishing colonies are often found in areas with strong waves, likely due to the difficulty of collecting them in these areas. Because of these problems, scientists are calling for increased protection for organ pipe corals, ranging from protected areas to awareness campaigns, as well as investigating the potential for farming these corals.
