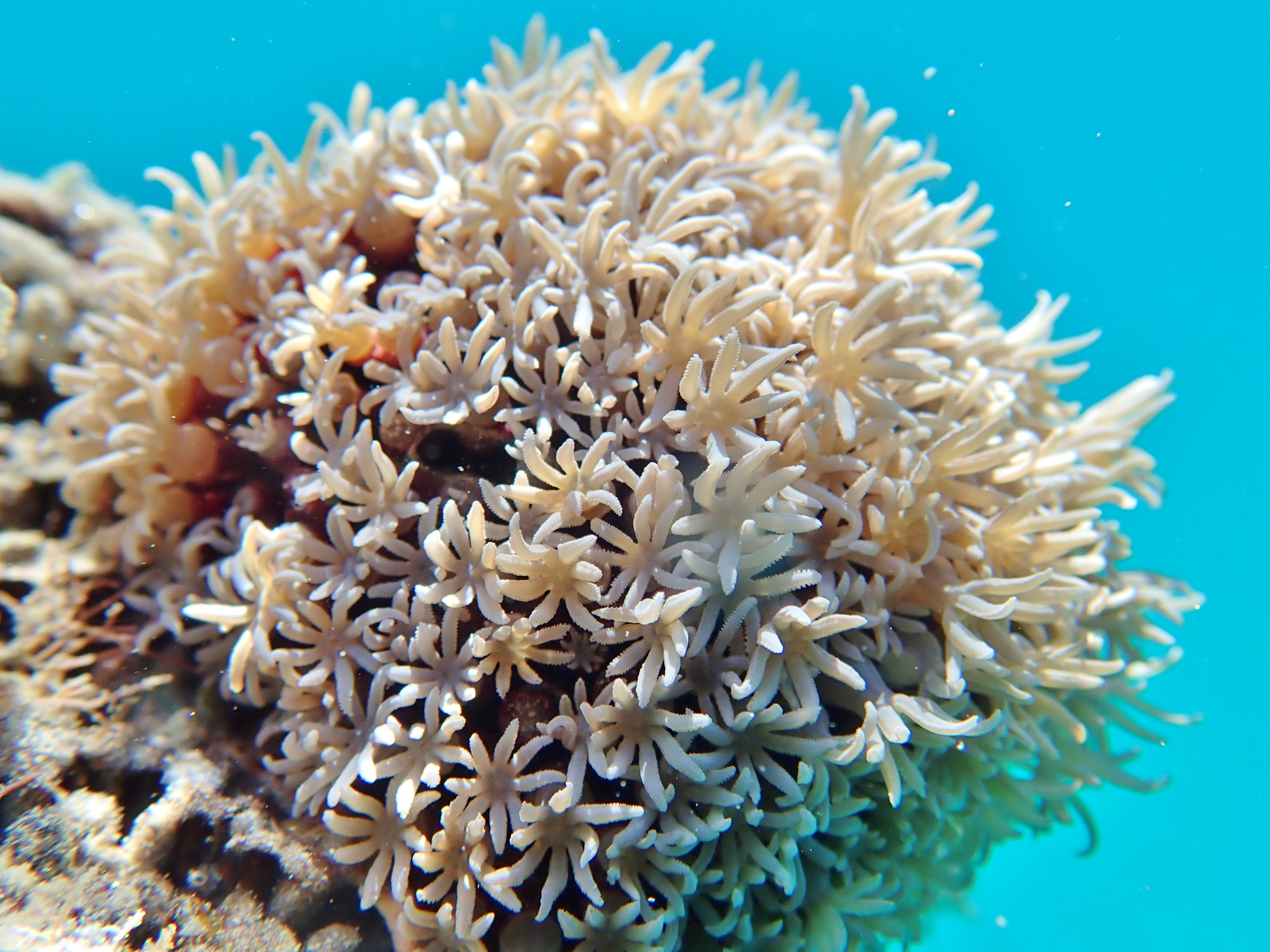
- Organ pipe coral

Scientific classification
- Kingdom: Animalia
- Phylum: Cnidaria
- Subphylum: Anthozoa
- Class: Octocorallia
- Order: Malacalcyonacea
- Family: Tubiporidae; Ehrenberg, 1828
- Genus: Tubipora; Linnaeus, 1758

= Tubipora =

Genus of corals

Tubipora is a genus of soft coral. It is the only genus within the monotypic family Tubiporidae.

== Species ==
The following species are recognized:

- Tubipora chamissonis Ehrenberg, 1834
- Tubipora fimbriata Dana, 1846
- Tubipora hemprichi Ehrenberg, 1834
- Tubipora musica Linnaeus, 1758 — Organ pipe coral
- Tubipora reptans Carter
- Tubipora rubeola Quoy & Gaimard, 1833
- Tubipora syringa Dana, 1846
