= Peale's Barber Farm Mastodon Exhumation Site =

- Peale's Barber Farm Mastodon Exhumation Site,
- U.S. National Register of Historic Places
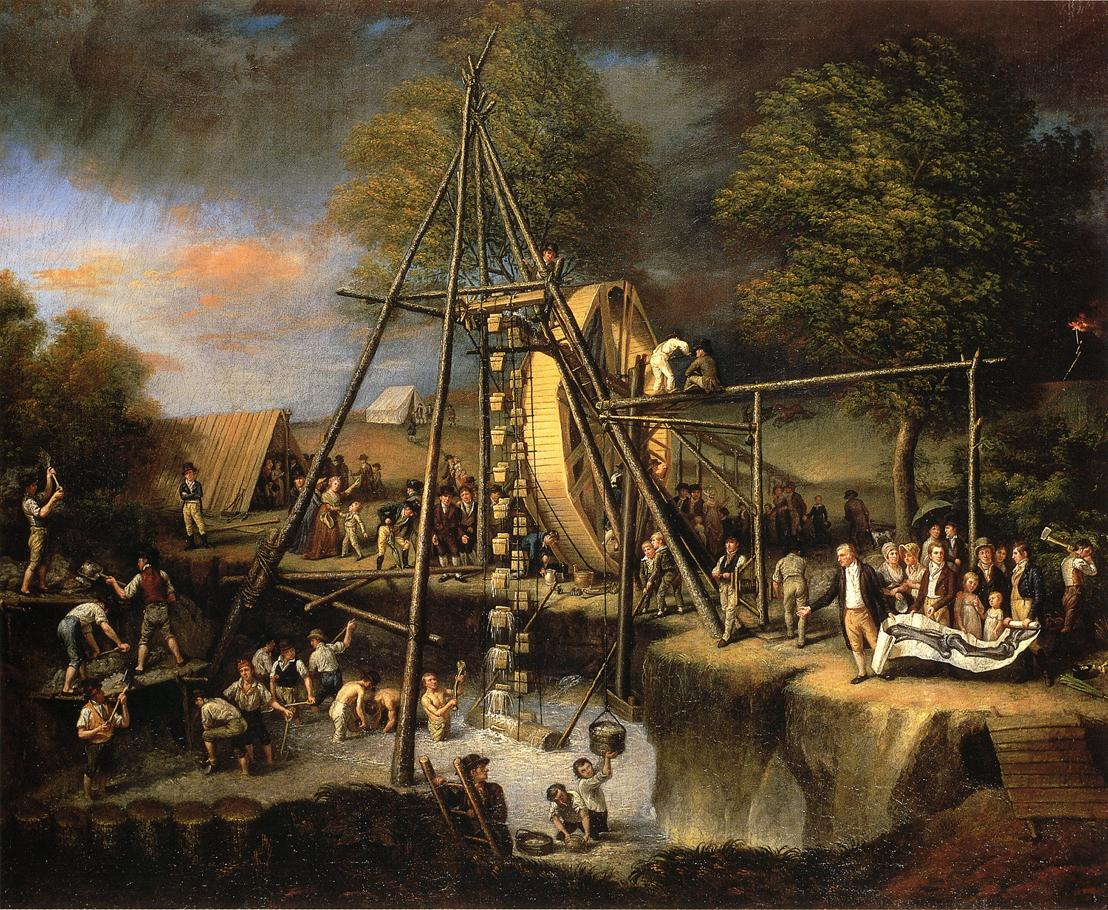
- Peale's 1806 painting, The Exhumation of the Mastodon

- Location within New York
- Location: Rt. 17K, vicinity of Montgomery, New York
- Coordinates: 41°31′35″N 74°13′4″W
- Area: 2.06 acres (0.83 ha)
- NRHP reference No.: 09000863
- Added to NRHP: October 20, 2009

The Peale's Barber Farm Mastodon Exhumation Site, near Montgomery, New York, is one of three sites of an 1801 exhumation of a mastodon which became "the world's first fully articulated prehistoric skeleton". The exhumation was led by artist/scientist Charles Willson Peale, owner of the Philadelphia Museum.

The site was listed on the U.S. National Register of Historic Places on October 20, 2009. The listing was announced as the featured listing in the National Park Service's weekly list of November 6, 2009.

The mastodon skeleton is exhibited at the Hessisches Landesmuseum Darmstadt in Darmstadt, Germany, though it was returned to the US for a temporary exhibit at the Smithsonian American Art Museum.

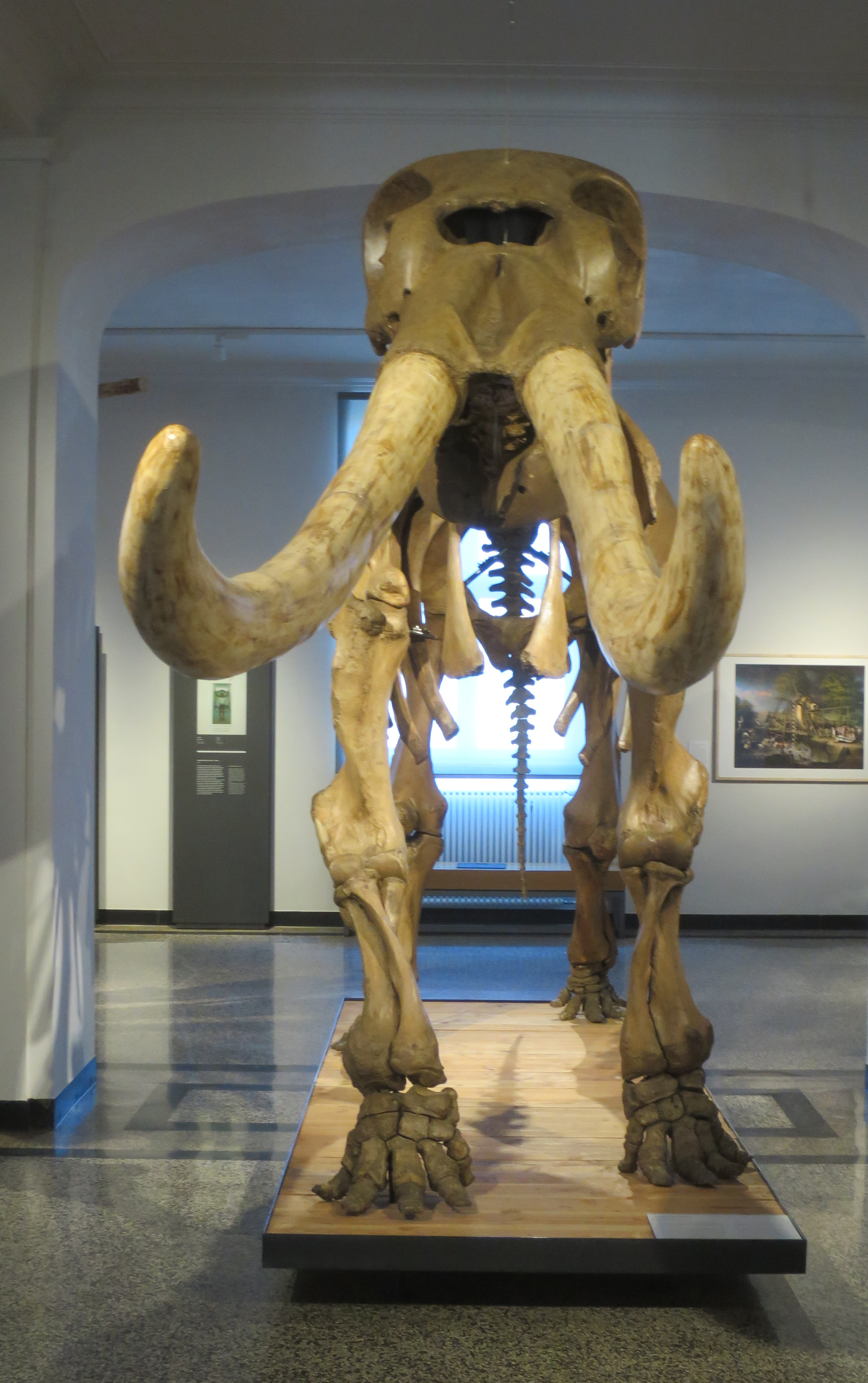
The mastodon exhibited at Hessisches Landesmuseum Darmstadt
