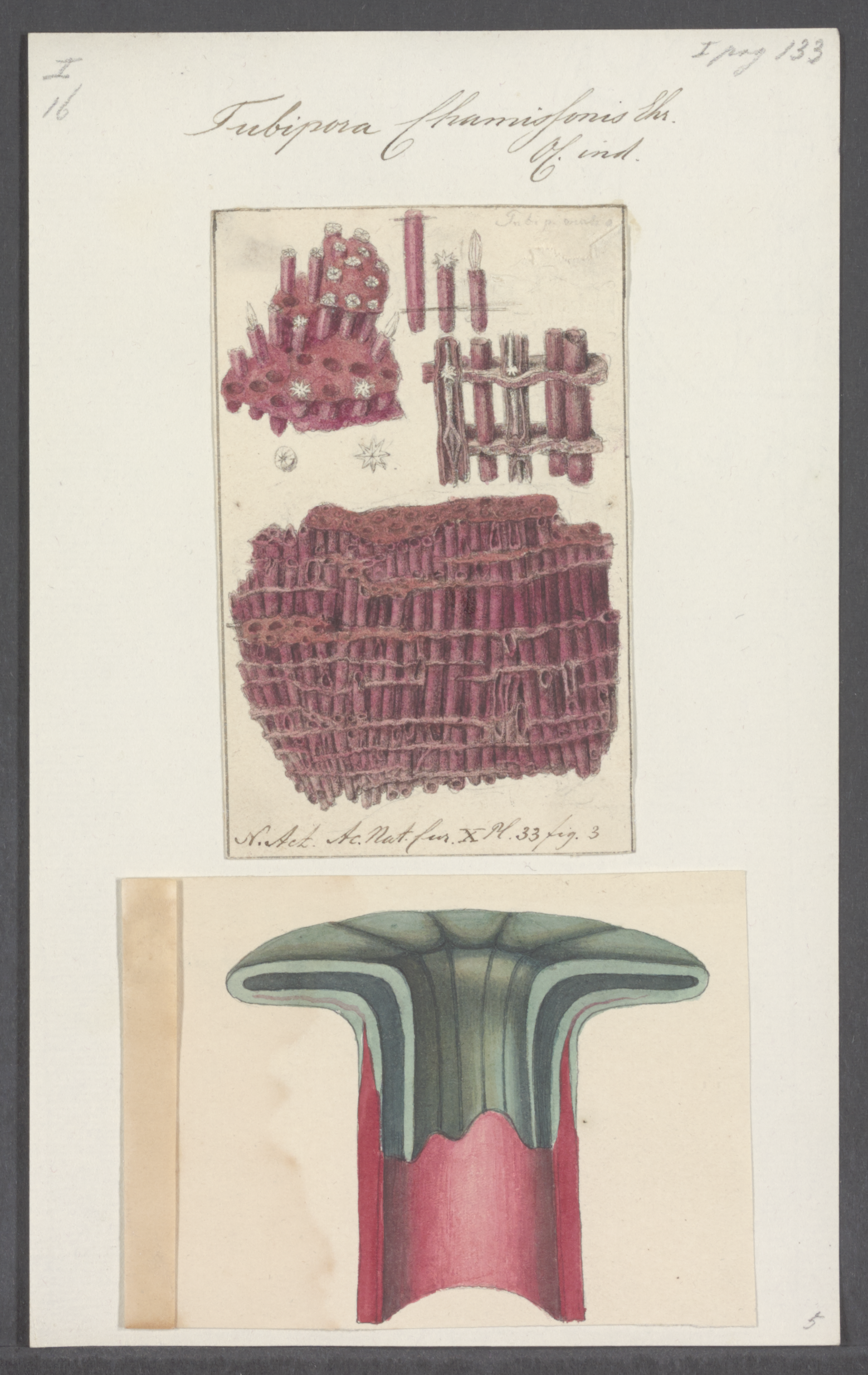

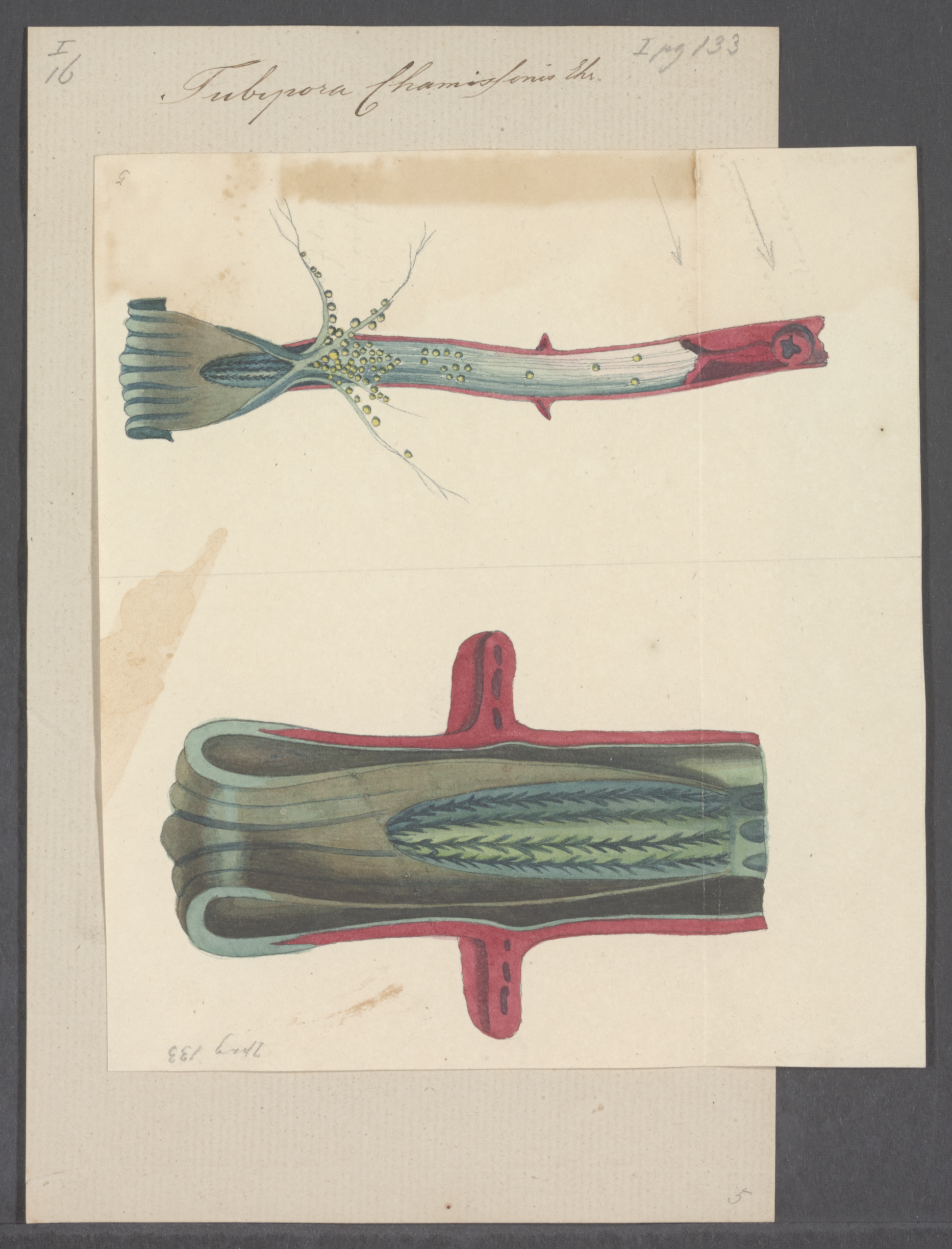

Scientific classification
- Domain: Eukaryota
- Kingdom: Animalia
- Phylum: Cnidaria
- Subphylum: Anthozoa
- Class: Octocorallia
- Order: Malacalcyonacea
- Family: Tubiporidae
- Genus: Tubipora
- Species: T. chamissonis

Binomial name
- Tubipora chamissonis Ehrenberg, 1834

= Tubipora chamissonis =

Species of coral

Tubipora chamissonis is an organ coral in the family Tubiporidae. It was first described in 1834 by Christian Gottfried Ehrenberg, from a specimen collected near Radack Island (in the Marshall Islands).
