= Hermann Hoffmann =

German botanist and mycologist (1819–1891)

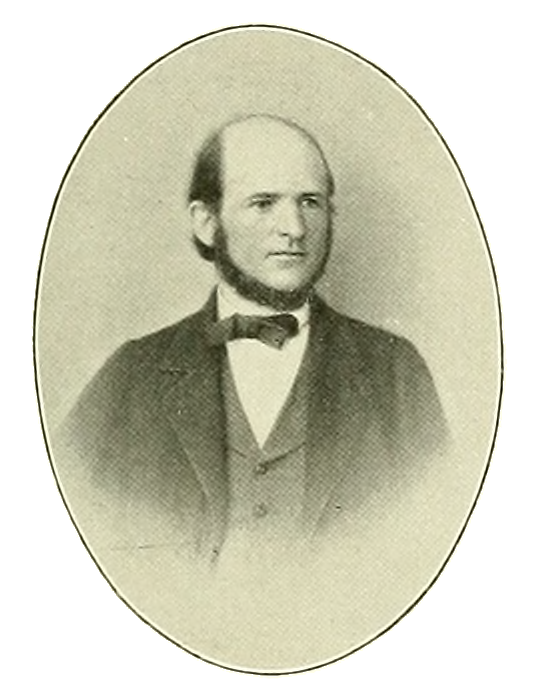
Hermann Hoffmann

Heinrich Karl (or Carl) Hermann Hoffmann (German: [ˈhaɪnʁɪç ˈkaʁl ˈhɛʁman ˈhɔfman]; April 1819 – 26 October 1891) was a German botanist and mycologist born in Rödelheim.

== Career ==
He studied medicine at the University of Giessen, and in 1839 furthered his education in Berlin as a student of physiologist Johannes Peter Müller (1801–1858). In 1842 he earned his habilitation at Giessen, where he worked as a private lecturer. During this time his focus turned exclusively to botany, and in 1853 he became a professor of botany and director of the botanical gardens at Giessen. He maintained these positions until his death in 1891.

Hoffmann was a pioneer of botanical phenology (plant climatology). He also did important studies in the fields of plant physiology and phytogeography. He conducted research involving the biological aspects of fungi in relation to fermentation, putrefaction and disease, and also performed early investigations in the field of bacteriology.

In 1869, Hoffmann wrote a book on species and varieties that included a long excerpt from Gregor Mendel's genetics paper of 1865. The book attempted to refute Charles Darwin's theory of evolution. Darwin had an annotated copy of the book.

== Published works ==
- Schilderung der deutschen Pflanzenfamilien vom botanisch-deskriptiven u. physiologisch-chemischen Standpunkt (Portrayal of German plant families from a botanical-descriptive and physiological-chemical standpoint), (Gießen 1846).
- Untersuchungen über den Pflanzenschlaf (Investigations involving "plant sleep"), (Gießen 1851).
- Pflanzenverbreitung u. Pflanzenwanderung (Plant spread and migration), (Darmstadt 1852).
- Witterung und Wachstum, oder Grundzüge der Pflanzenklimatalogie (Weather and growth, main features of plant climatology), (Leipzig 1857).
- Lehrbuch der Botanik (Textbook of botany), (Darmstadt 1857).
- "Icones analyticae fungorum" (Gießen 1861–65).
- "Index fungorum" (Leipzig 1863).
- Untersuchungen zur Bestimmung des Werthes von Species und Varietät. Ein Beitrag zur Kritik der Darwin'schen Hypothese (Researches on the determination of the value of species and variety. A Contribution to the Critique of the Darwinian Hypothesis, 1869)
- Mykologische Berichte (Mycological reports), (1870–73, three parts).
- Pharmakologische Studien über die Alkaloide der Quebrachorinde . [s.l.] 1884 Digital edition by the University and State Library Düsseldorf
- Resultate der wichtigsten pflanzenphänologischen Beobachtungen in Europa (1885).

== See also ==
- Wilhelm Olbers Focke
