= Tubipora hemprichi =

Scientific classification
- Domain: Eukaryota
- Kingdom: Animalia
- Phylum: Cnidaria
- Subphylum: Anthozoa
- Class: Octocorallia
- Order: Malacalcyonacea
- Family: Tubiporidae
- Genus: Tubipora
- Species: T. hemprichi

Binomial name
- Tubipora hemprichi Ehrenberg, 1834

Species of coral

Tubipora hemprichi is an organ coral in the family Tubiporidae. It was first described in 1834 by Christian Gottfried Ehrenberg. The species name honours Wilhelm Hemprich, and was described from a specimen found in the Red Sea.

The species is marine and requires a hard surface to grow on.
