= Master of the Ortenberg Altarpiece =

German painter

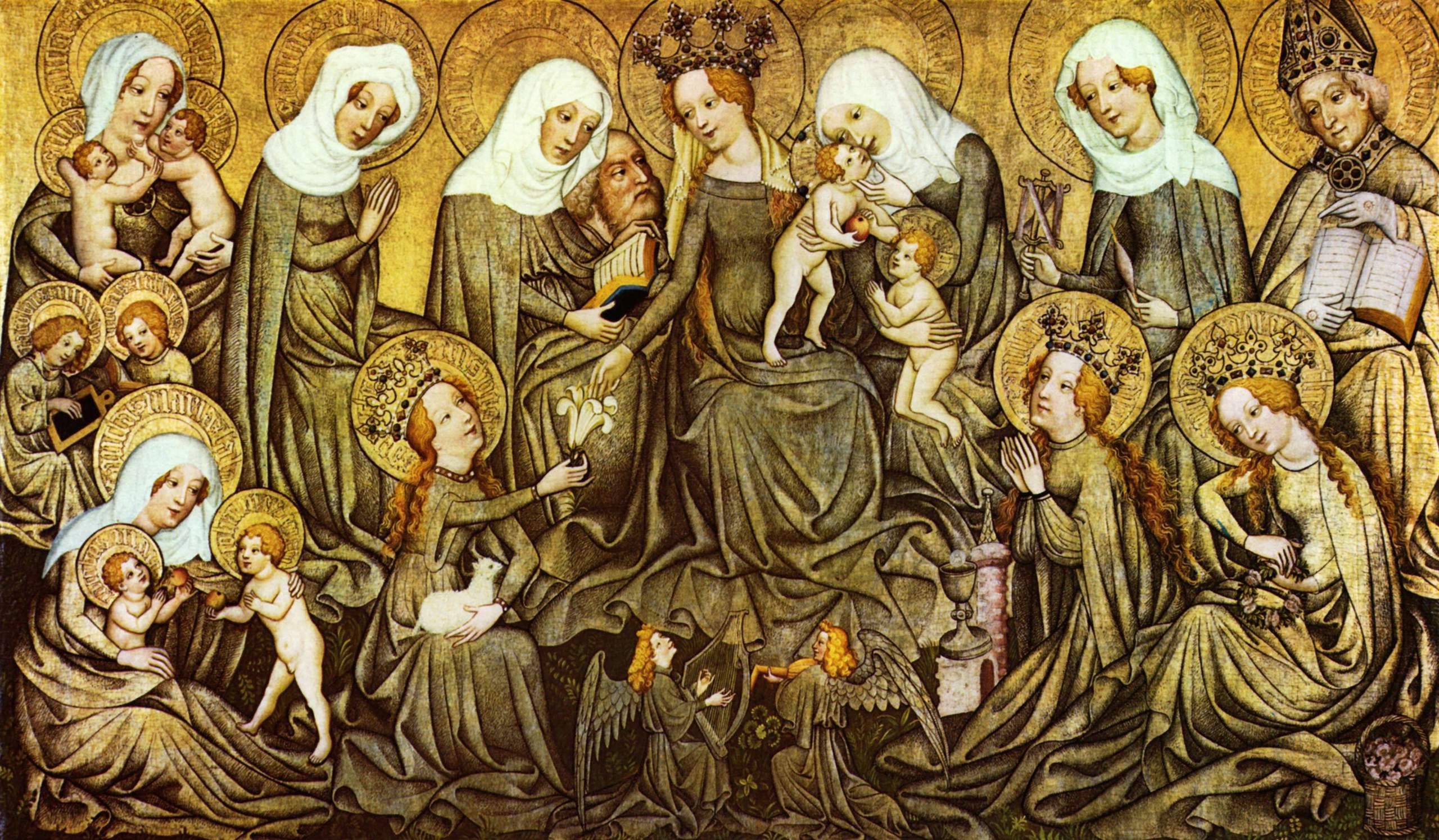
Ortenberg Altarpiece, c. 1420

The Master of the Ortenberg Altarpiece (German: Meister des Ortenberger Altars) was an anonymous German painter, active on the Middle Rhine in the early 15th century.

His work shows traces of the influence of Robert Campin. His name is derived from an altarpiece painted between 1410 and 1420 for the church of Ortenberg; this may currently be found in a museum collection in Darmstadt.
