= Hessisches Landesmuseum Darmstadt =

German multidisciplinary museum

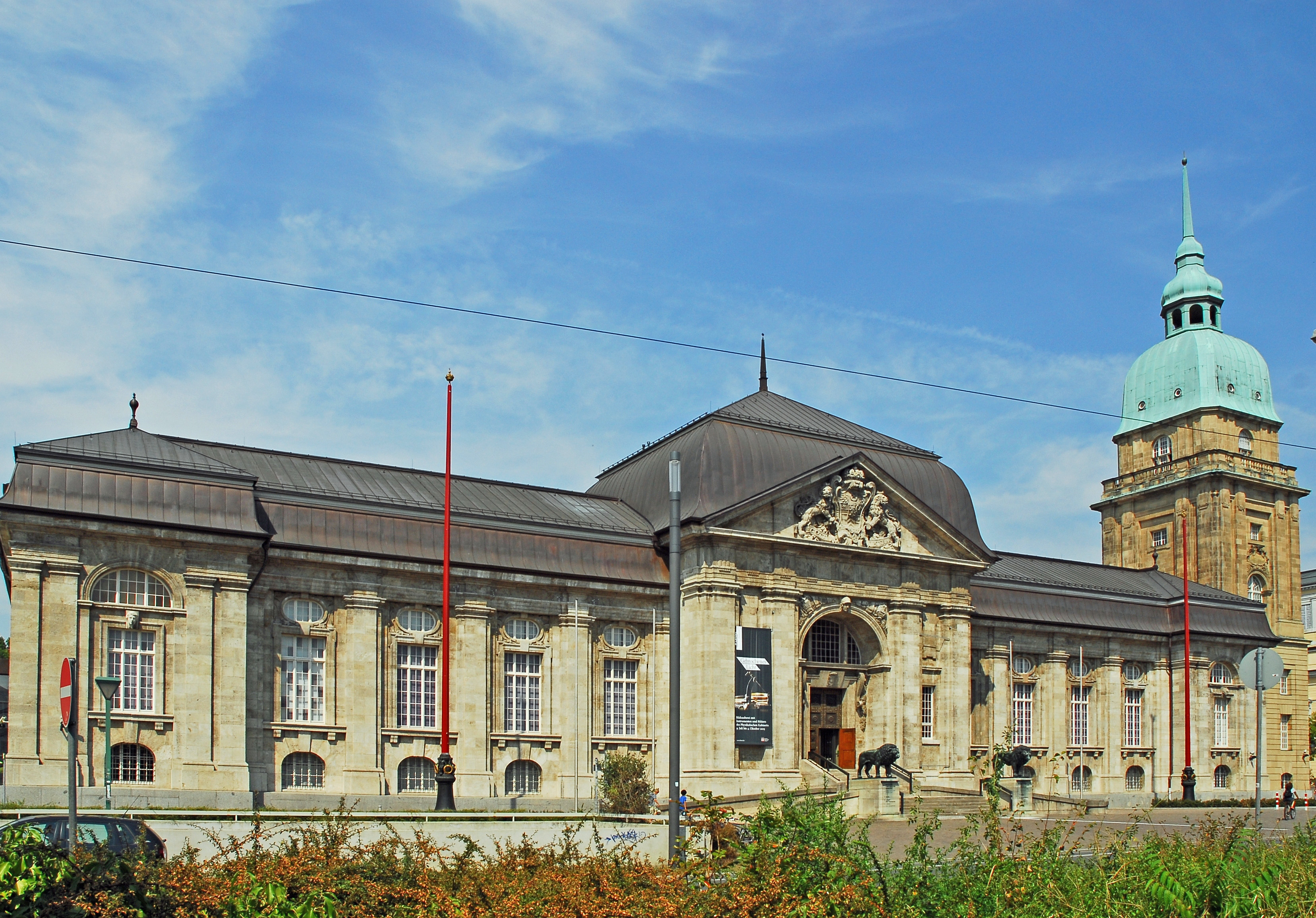
- Front side of the museum in 2015
- Former name: Großherzoglich Hessisches Landesmuseum zu Darmstadt
- Established: 12 July 1820; 206 years ago
- Location: Friedensplatz 1, Darmstadt, Germany
- Coordinates: 49°52′30″N 8°39′13″E
- Type: Multidisciplinary museum
- Key holdings: Drawings Dürer/Rembrandt, Block Beuys, A Forest of Sculptures, Messel pit fossils, American mastodon
- Collections: Paintings, sculptures, prints and drawings, geology, paleontology, zoology, cultural history
- Collection size: 1.35 million objects; 100,000 exhibits
- Visitors: c. 80,000
- Founder: Louis I, Grand Duke of Hesse
- Director: Martin Faass
- Architects: Alfred Messel (1906); Georg Zimmermann (rebuild 1955); Reinhold Kargel (extension 1984)
- Owner: Hessian Ministry of Higher Education, Research and the Arts
- Employees: 83 (2014)
- Public transit access: Tram, bus: Schloss, Luisenplatz
- Parking: Schlossgarage
- Website: www.hlmd.de

Hessisches Landesmuseum Darmstadt (HLMD) is a large multidisciplinary museum in Darmstadt, Germany. The museum exhibits Rembrandt, Beuys, a primeval horse and a mastodon under the slogan "The whole world under one roof". As one of the oldest public museums in Germany, it has c. 80,000 visitors every year and a collection size of 1.35 million objects. Since 2019, Martin Faass has been director of the museum. It is one of the three Hessian State museums, in addition to the museums in Kassel and Wiesbaden. Similar institutions in Europe are the Universalmuseum Joanneum in Graz and the National Museum of Scotland in Edinburgh.

== History ==
Art and natural history collections of the Landgraves of Hesse-Darmstadt have been established since the 17th century. The museum was founded on 12 July 1820 with the donation of the collections of Louis I, Grand Duke of Hesse. Initially located in the Baroque part of the Residential Palace Darmstadt, the museum moved in 1906 to a nearby new building. In 1937, 82 works of Modern art were confiscated during the Degenerate art campaign. In the Brandnacht (fire night) on 11 to 12 September 1944 the museum building was partly destroyed; it was reconstructed and reopened in 1955.

== Building ==
The main building was begun in 1897 by Alfred Messel and inaugurated in 1906. The encyclopedic museum consists of several period rooms or experience spaces, a monumental entrance hall with a staircase in Palladian architecture, a Pompeian style wing (509 BC – 400 AD) for the ancient art (including Roman courtyard and Oceanus mosaic), Romanesque corridors and chapels (900–1300) for the medieval treasure art, a Late Gothic hall (1350–1500) for the historical weapons, the Italian Renaissance Chiavenna room (c. 1580) for the Princely Treasury and corresponding open courtyards. The large east-wing Baroque hall Großer Saal with an imposing barrel vault is used for special exhibitions. This asymmetric agglomeration of architectural styles, according to the design philosophy "Form follows function", is embedded in a rather rigid grid. The south-east tower, containing the library, is based on the tower of an 18th century Baroque plan for the Residential Palace Darmstadt by Louis Remy de la Fosse, that was realized only partly.

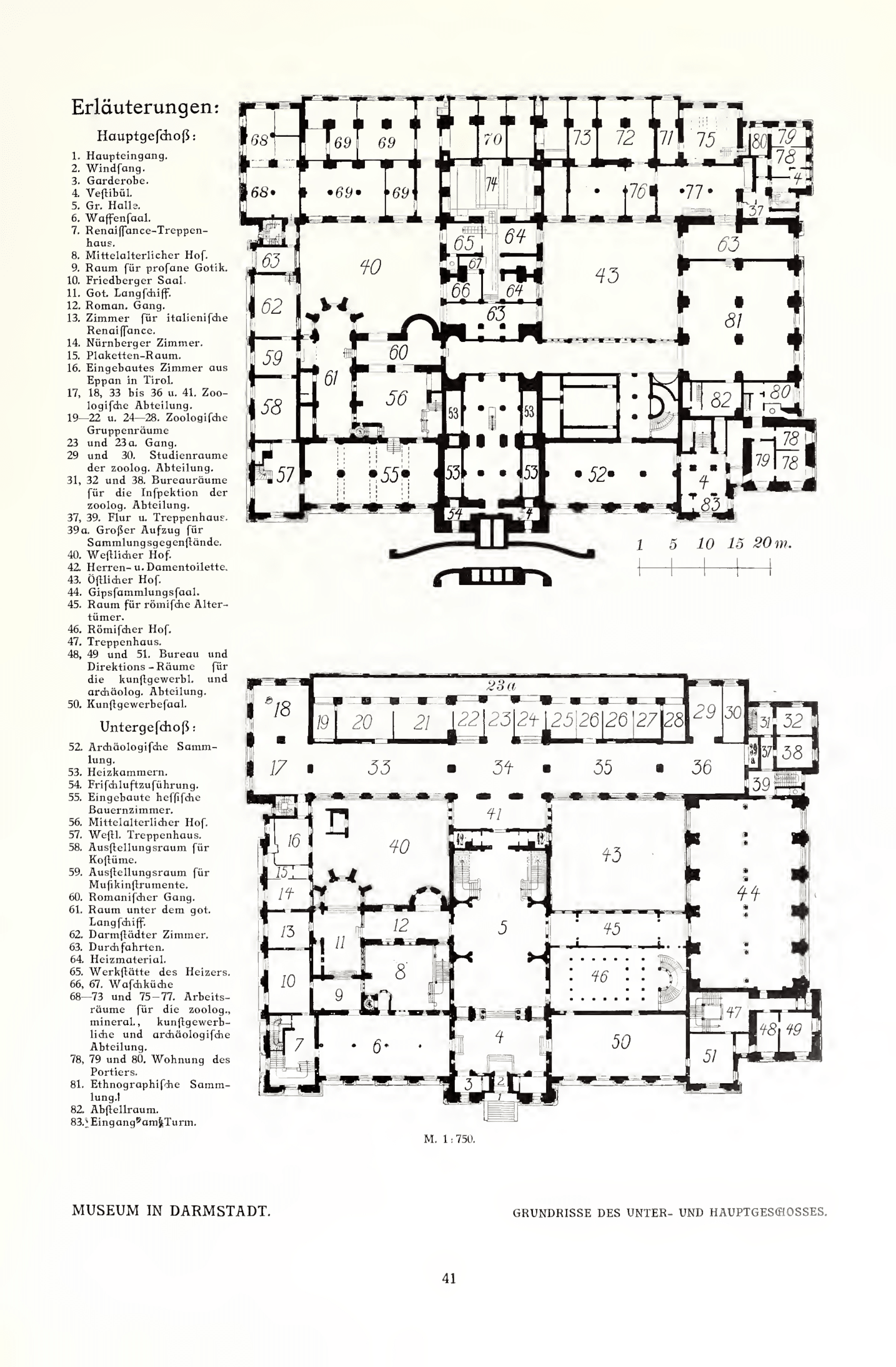
Floor plan at the time of construction, published 1911

=== Location ===
The museum is located between Residential Palace Darmstadt and the urban park Herrngarten. Nearby are the neoclassical former court theatre Haus der Geschichte Darmstadt (House of History) by Georg Moller, the squares Friedensplatz and Karolinenplatz, as well as the street Zeughausstraße (Cityring).

City Centre Darmstadt
City Centre Darmstadt
1 Residential Palace Darmstadt
2 Hessisches Landesmuseum Darmstadt
3 Haus der Geschichte (former court theatre)
4 Audimax TU Darmstadt (largest lecture hall)
5 Kongresszentrum darmstadtium (congress centre)
6 Altes Rathaus (former town hall)
7 Luisenplatz
8 Friedensplatz (peace square)
9 Karolinenplatz
10 Marktplatz (market square)
11 Herrngarten (urban park)

=== Renovations and extensions ===
A large extension on the west side of the main building was designed by Reinhold Kargel, completed in 1984. As of 2023, the controversial, confusing modern building extension houses the painting gallery with 400 paintings. After major €80 million renovations from 2007 onwards, it reopened on 13 September 2014. About 100,000 exhibits are displayed on 9,000 m^{2} (97,000 ft^{2}) of exhibition space; the complete floor area is 12,000 m^{2} (130,000 ft^{2}). In its high-rise north wing, the museum houses the Art Nouveau/prehistory and early history, zoology/handicrafts, geology and modern/contemporary arts collections on floors one above the other. Cultural history is presented in the lower south wing.

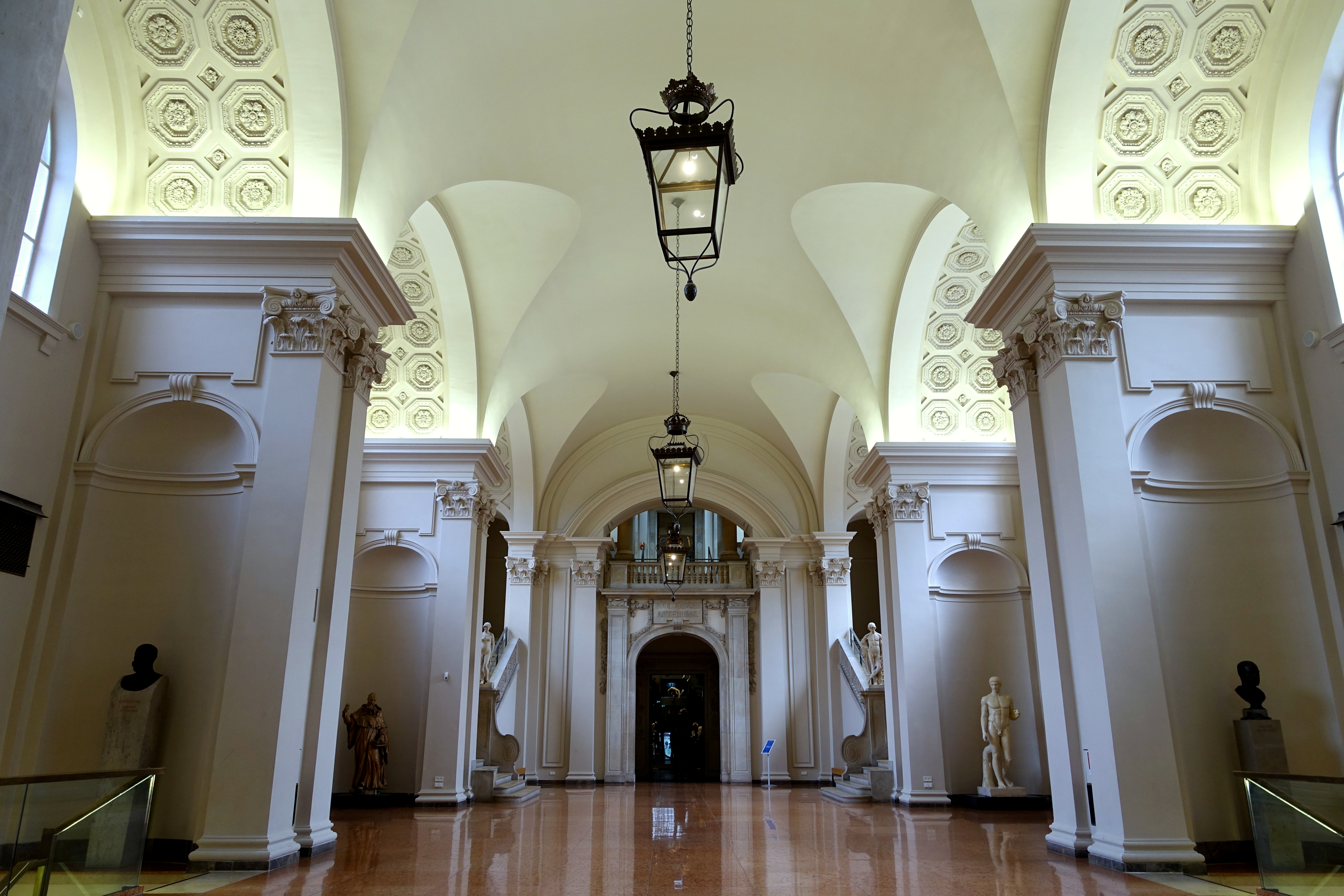
Entrance hall

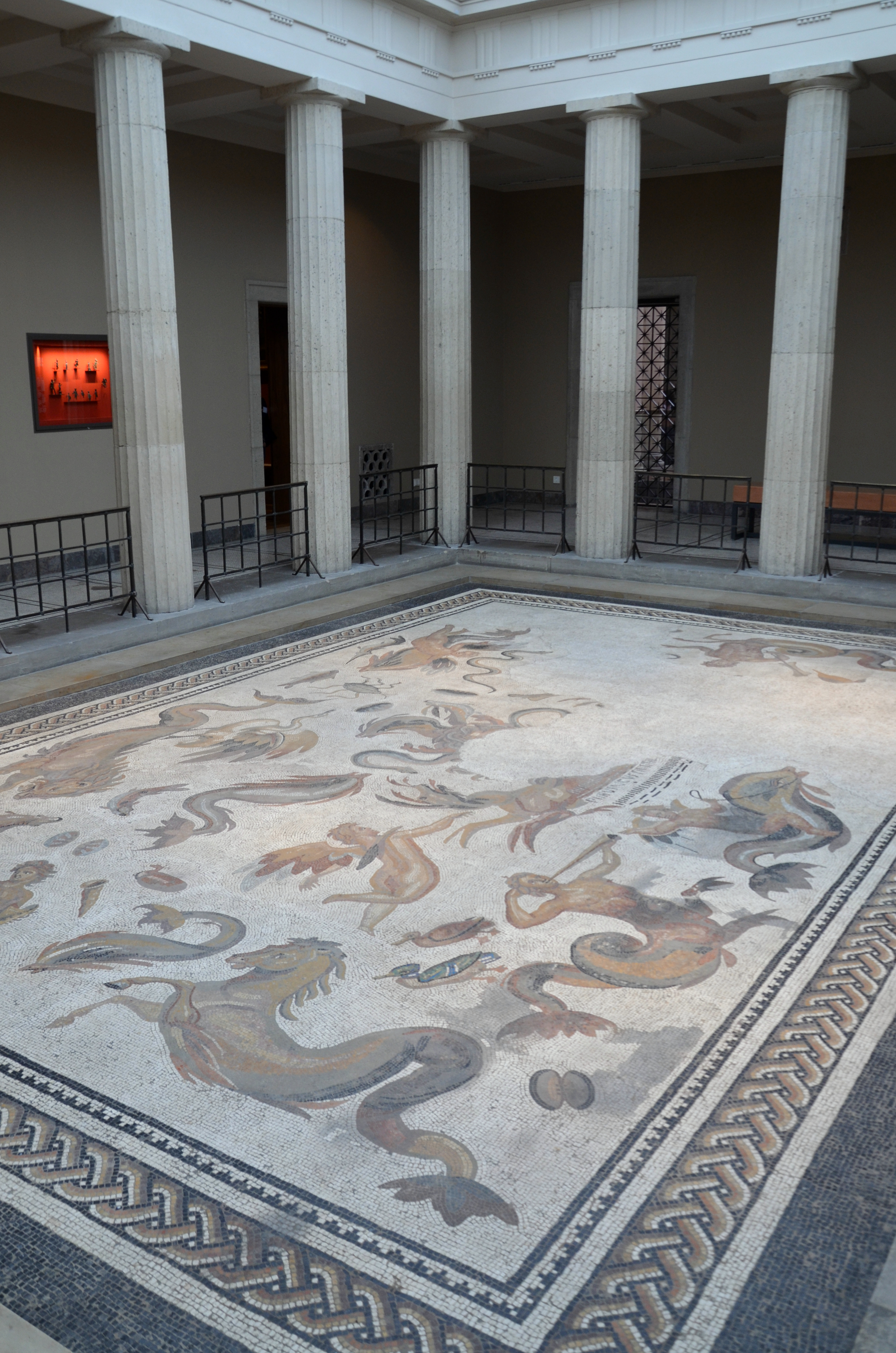
Roman courtyard and Oceanus mosaic

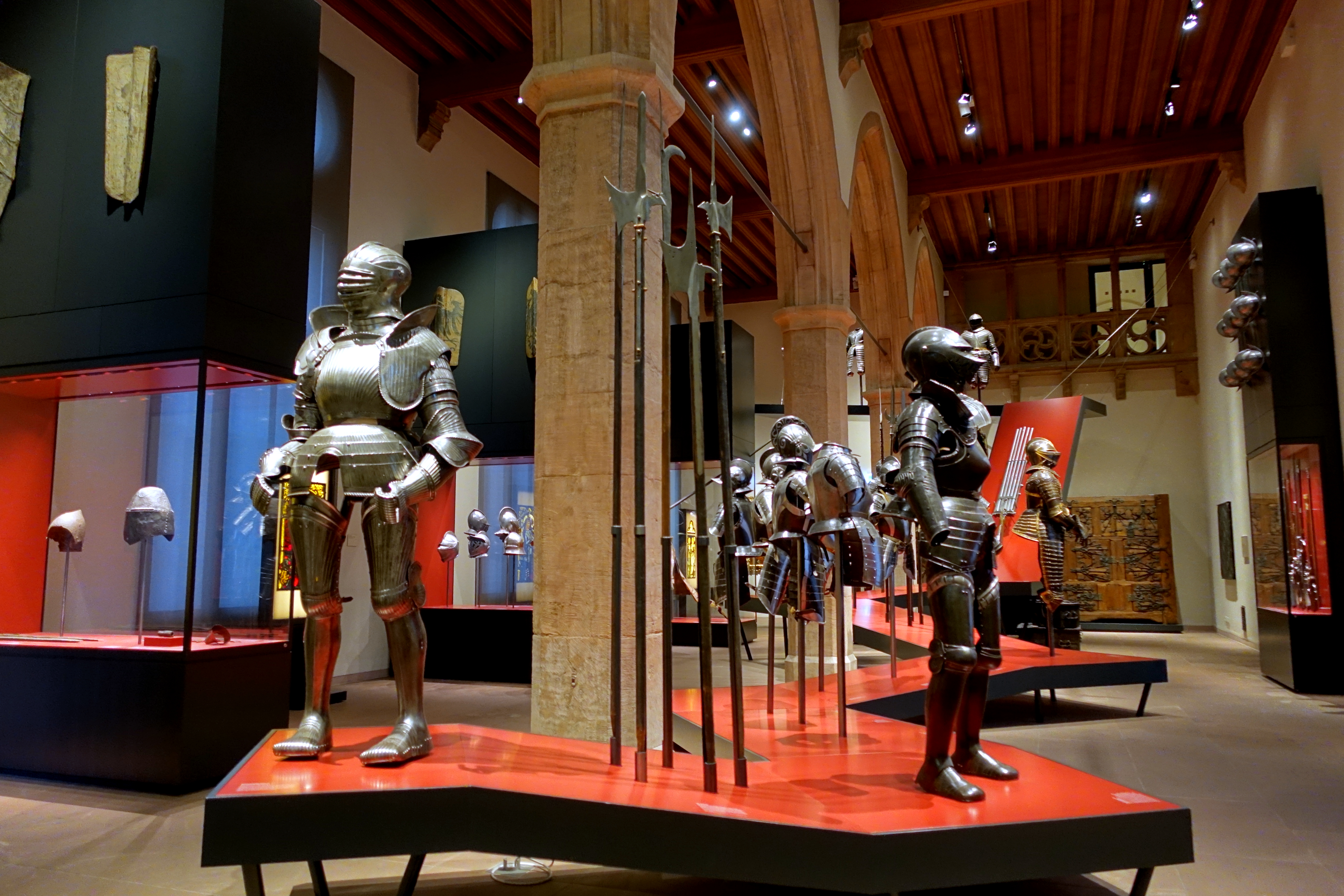
Gothic Armoury hall

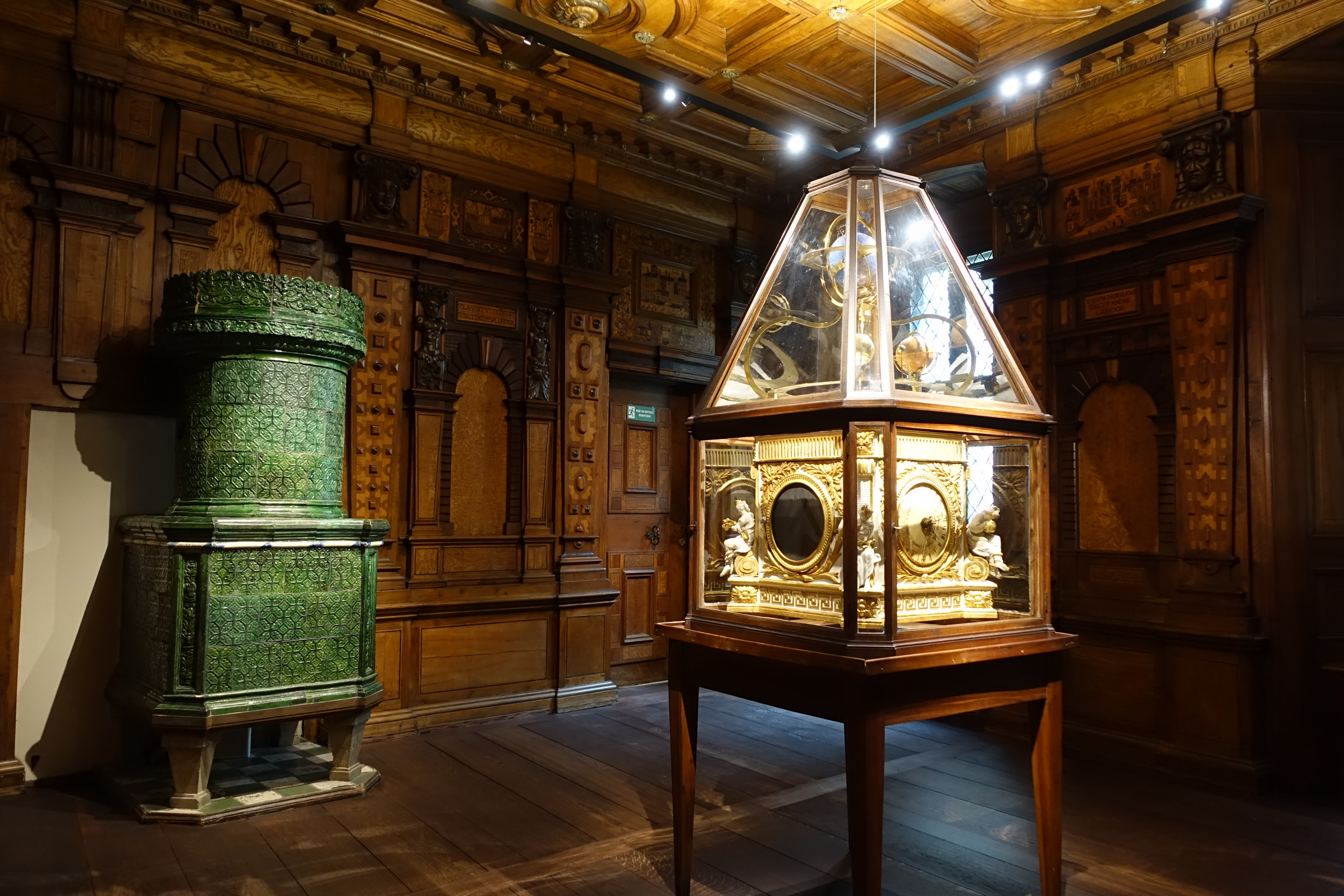
Chiavenna room

== Collections ==
The museum is especially noted for its art collection, including Pieter Brueghel the Elder's The Magpie on the Gallows, and one of the plaques from the Magdeburg Ivories (c. 968). There are also strong collections of Art Nouveau objects from several countries, and German, Dutch and Flemish paintings. Basis of the graphic collection are the works by Dürer and Rembrandt, bought by museum founder Louis I, Grand Duke of Hesse in 1803. Interested visitors can request original prints and drawings in the study room.

It also features an important natural history collection, with for instance fossils from the nearby Messel pit and a historic American mastodon skeleton ("Peale's mastodon"), originally exhibited at Peale's Philadelphia Museum, purchased by the Darmstadt naturalist Johann Jakob Kaup. Also notable are the reconstructions of eleven hominid busts and ten large-scale habitat dioramas.

The Simon Spierer Collection A Forest of Sculptures includes works of well-known international artists of the 20th century from Early Modern to Contemporary art, like Constantin Brâncuși, Alberto Giacometti, Max Ernst, Henry Moore, Tony Cragg, Hans Arp, Barbara Hepworth. Spierer donated the sculpture collection in 2004. Stele and Torso are the predominant motifs.

The museum owns 290 objects by Joseph Beuys in seven rooms ("Block Beuys"), the world's largest complex of his works. Key works of the 1970 installation are expansive felt objects (1964–67), Fond III (layered felt and copper, 1969), Scenes from the Deer Hunt (big closet with compartments filled with many small objects, 1961) and Chair with Fat (1963). Beuys worked on the installation until his death in 1986. Richard Rijnvos wrote music to each of the seven rooms.

== Gallery ==
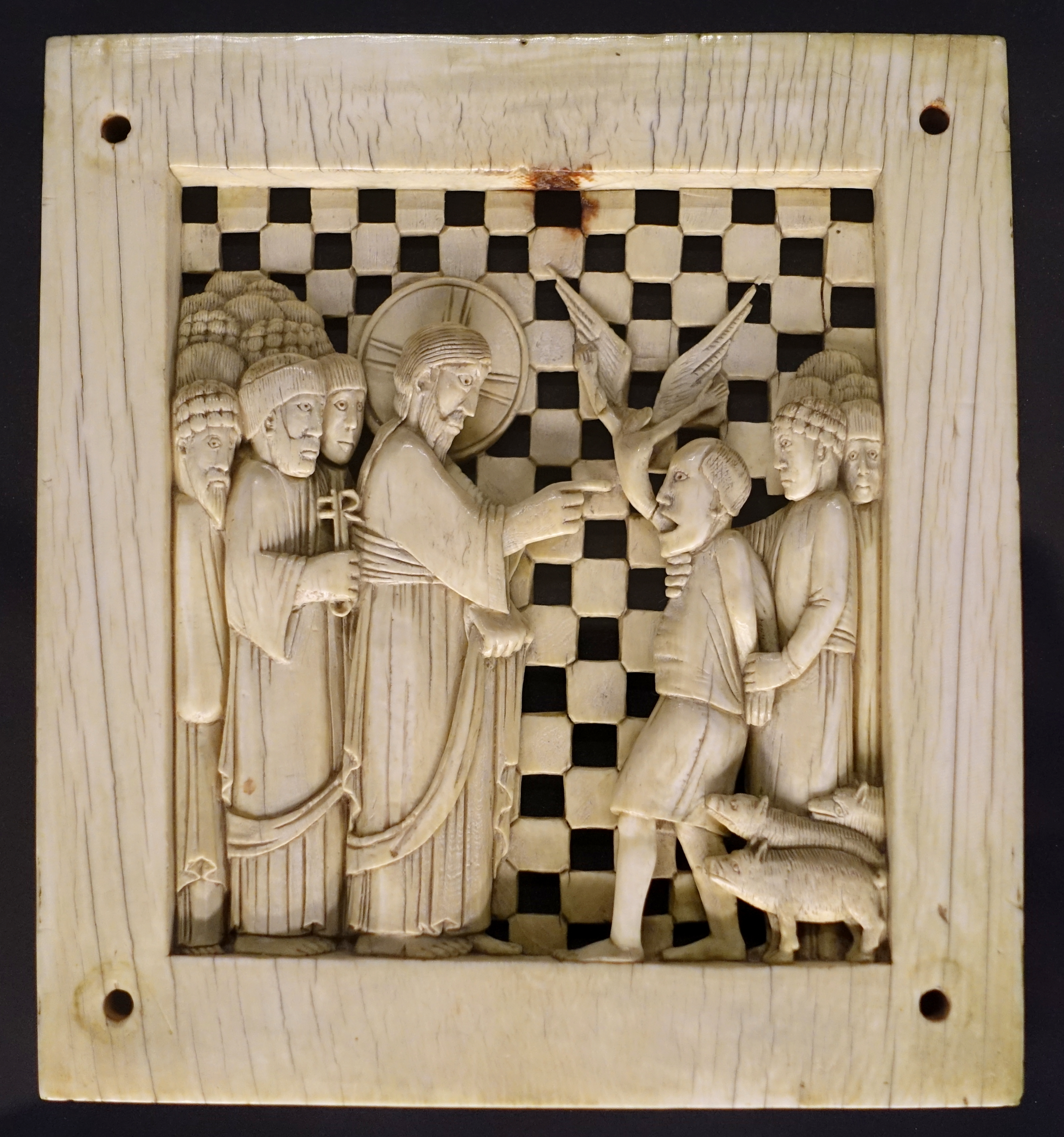
Magdeburg Ivories Christ healing the possessed of Gerasa

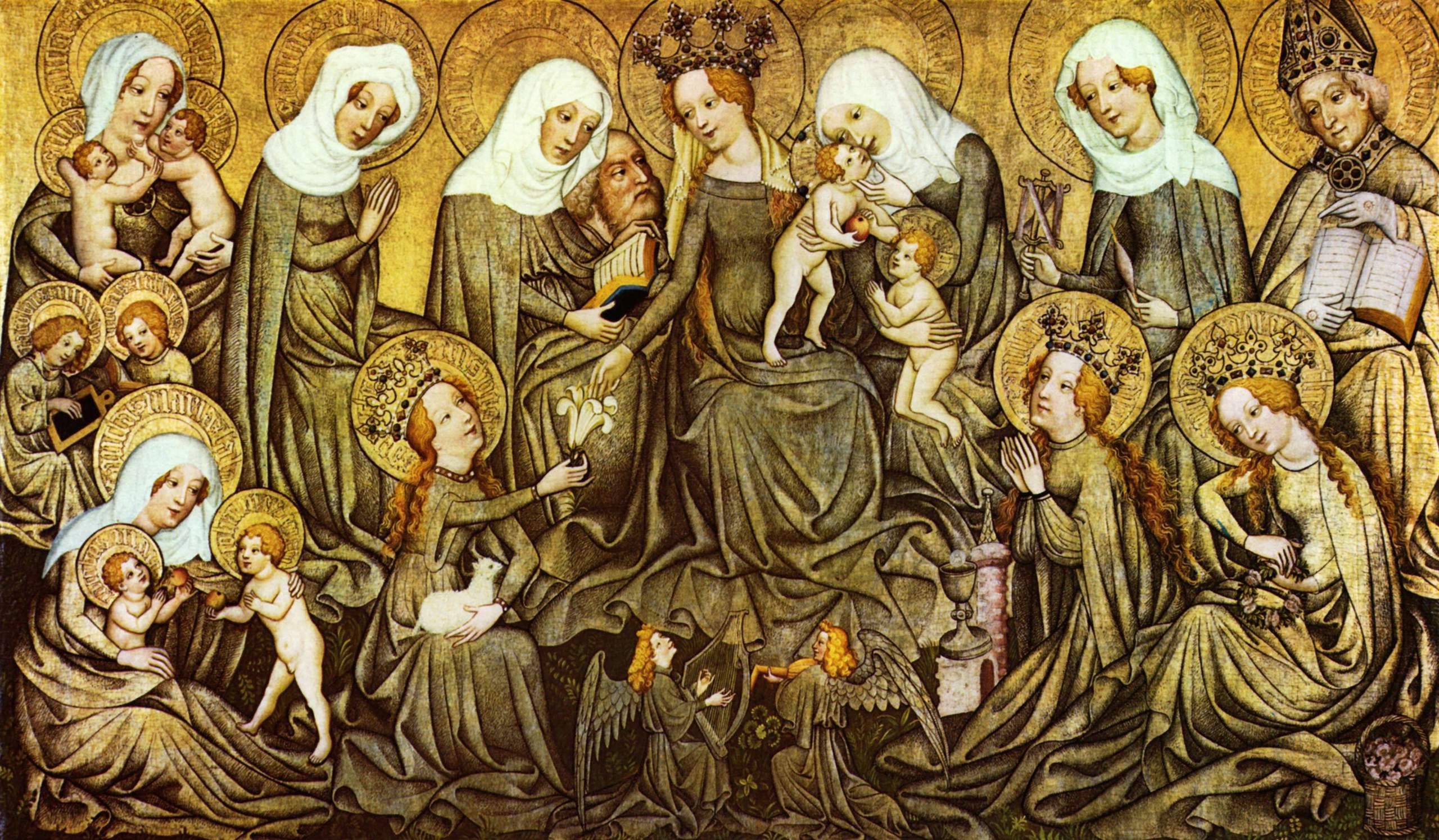
Ortenberg Altarpiece, c. 1420

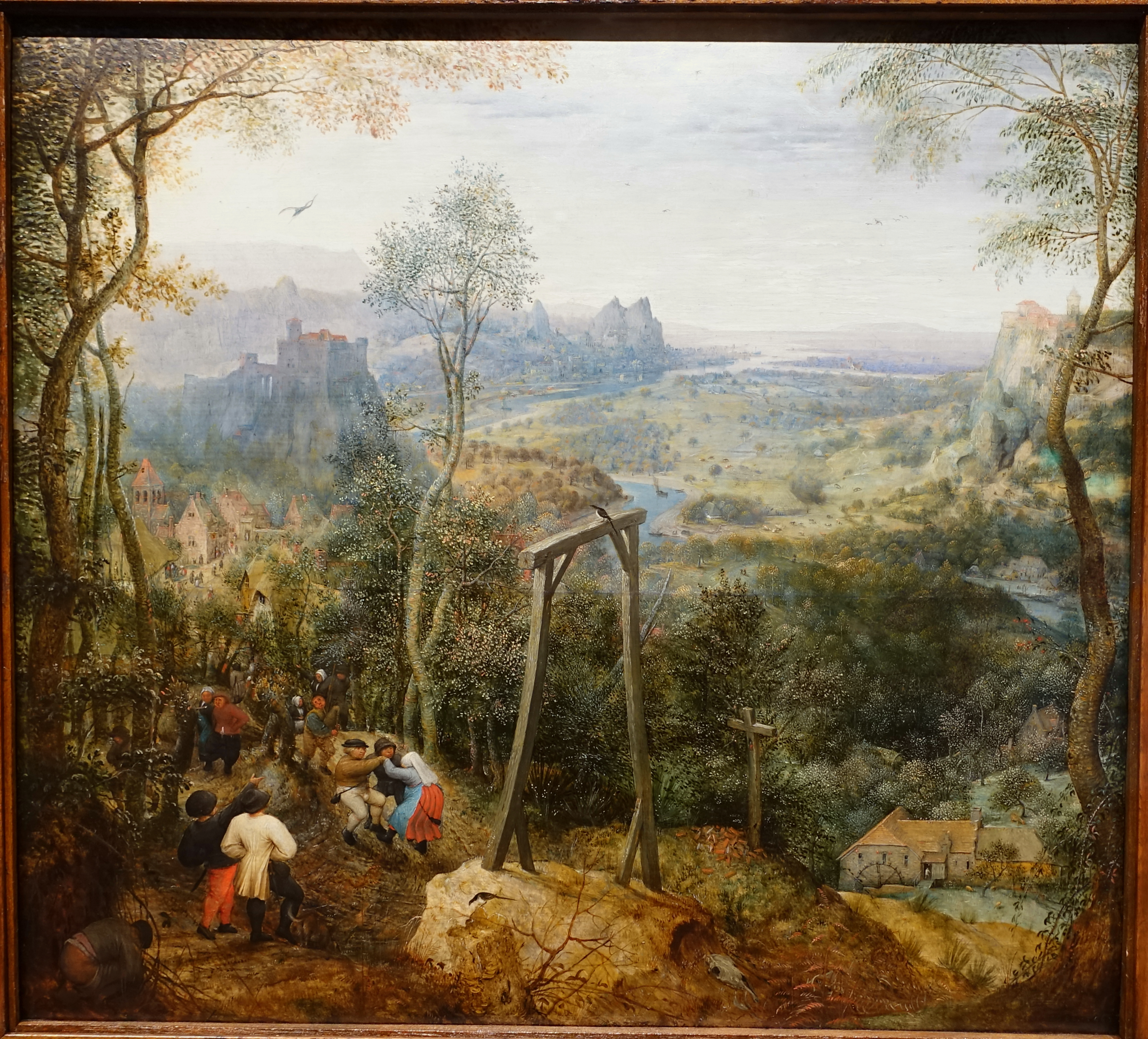
Pieter Bruegel the Elder The Magpie on the Gallows

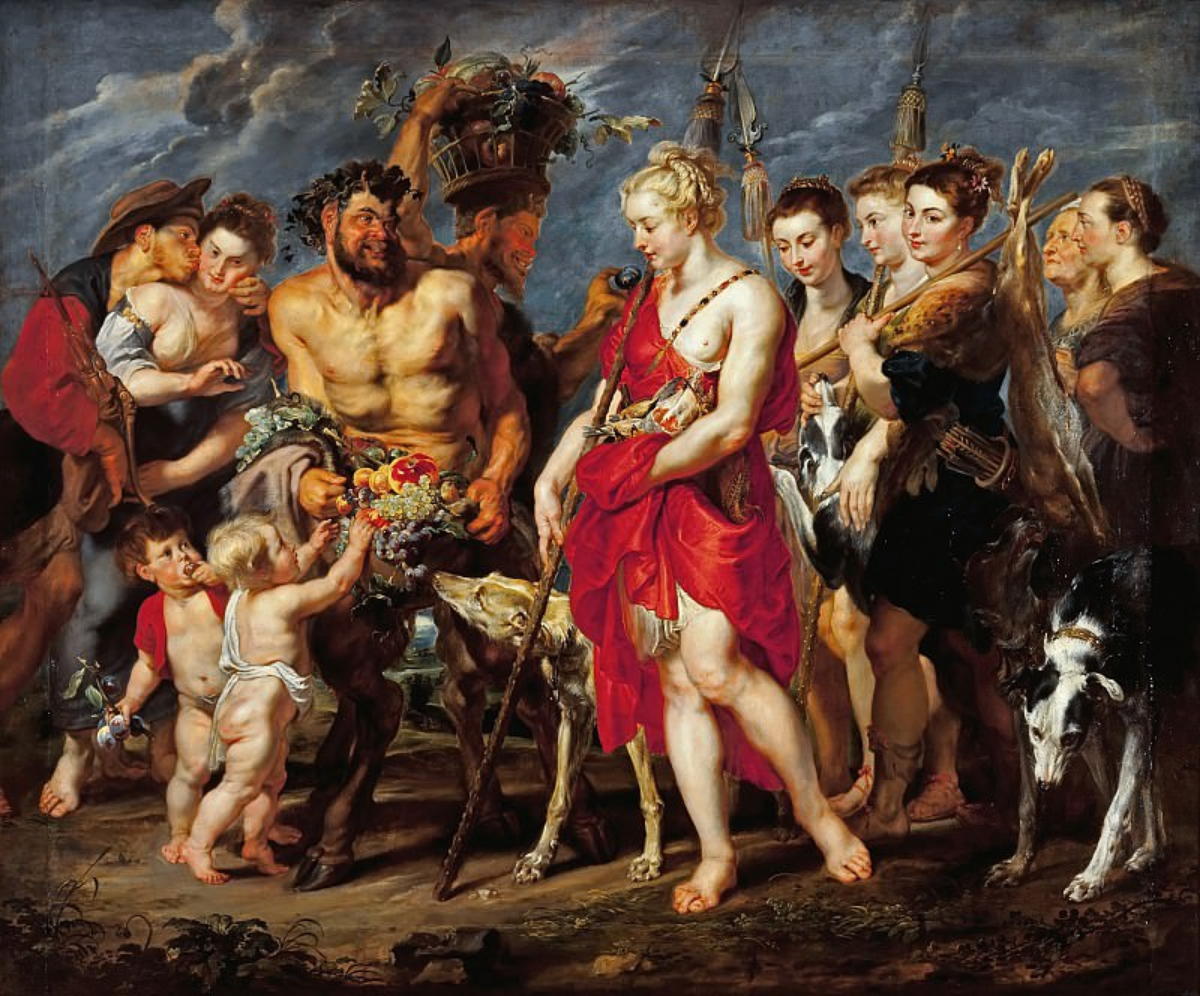
Peter Paul Rubens Diana Returning from the Chase

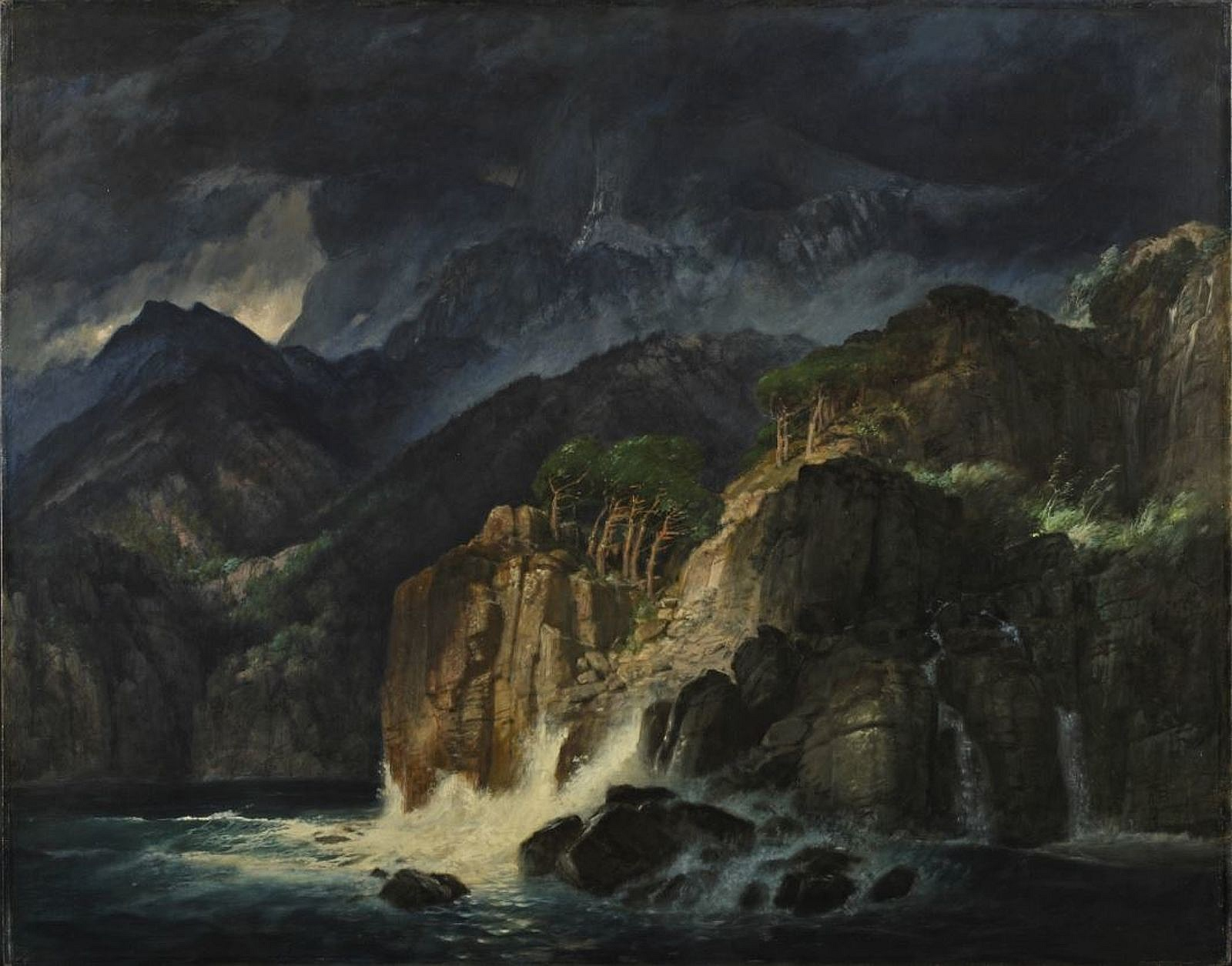
Arnold Böcklin Chained Prometheus

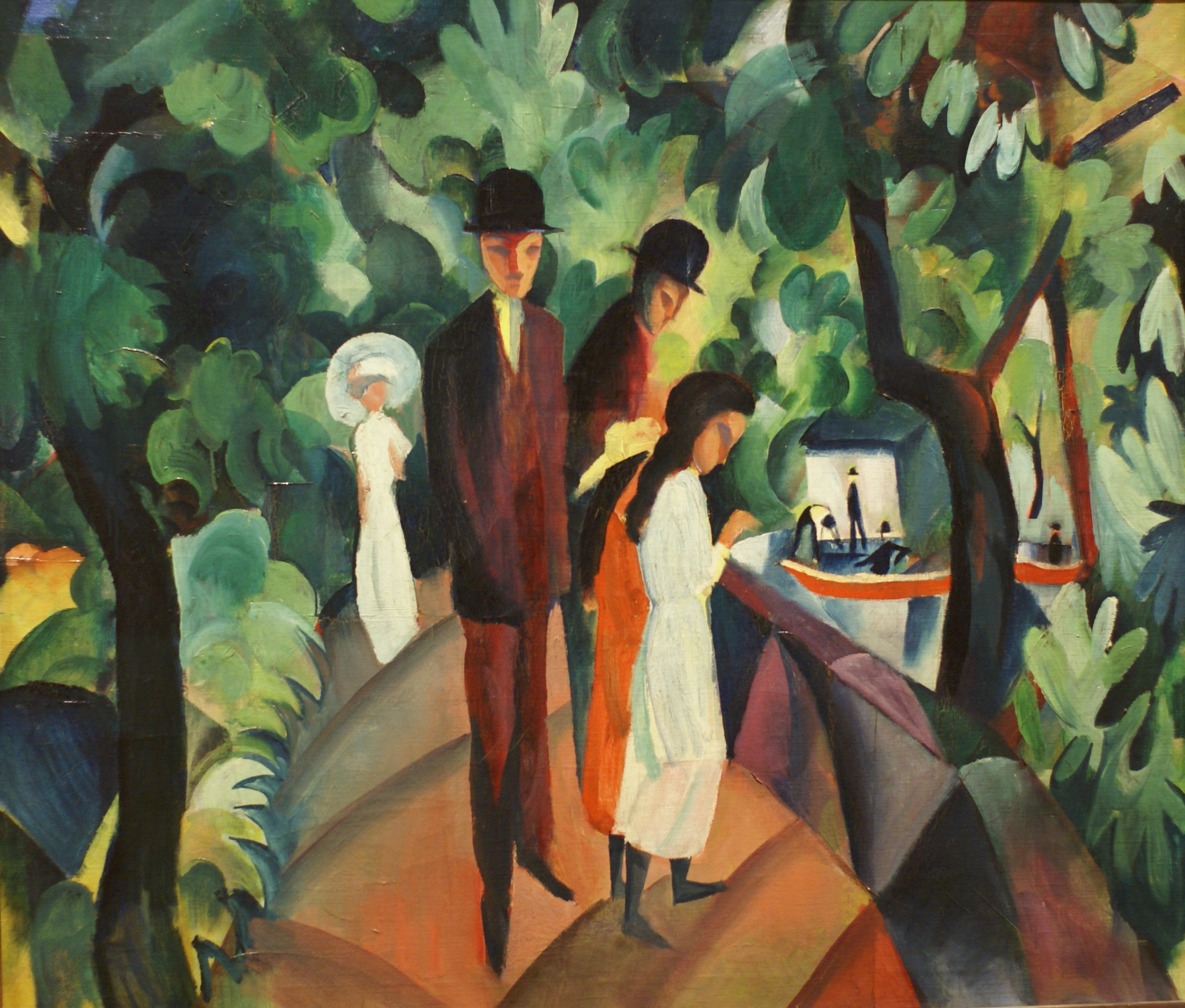
August Macke Walk on the Bridge

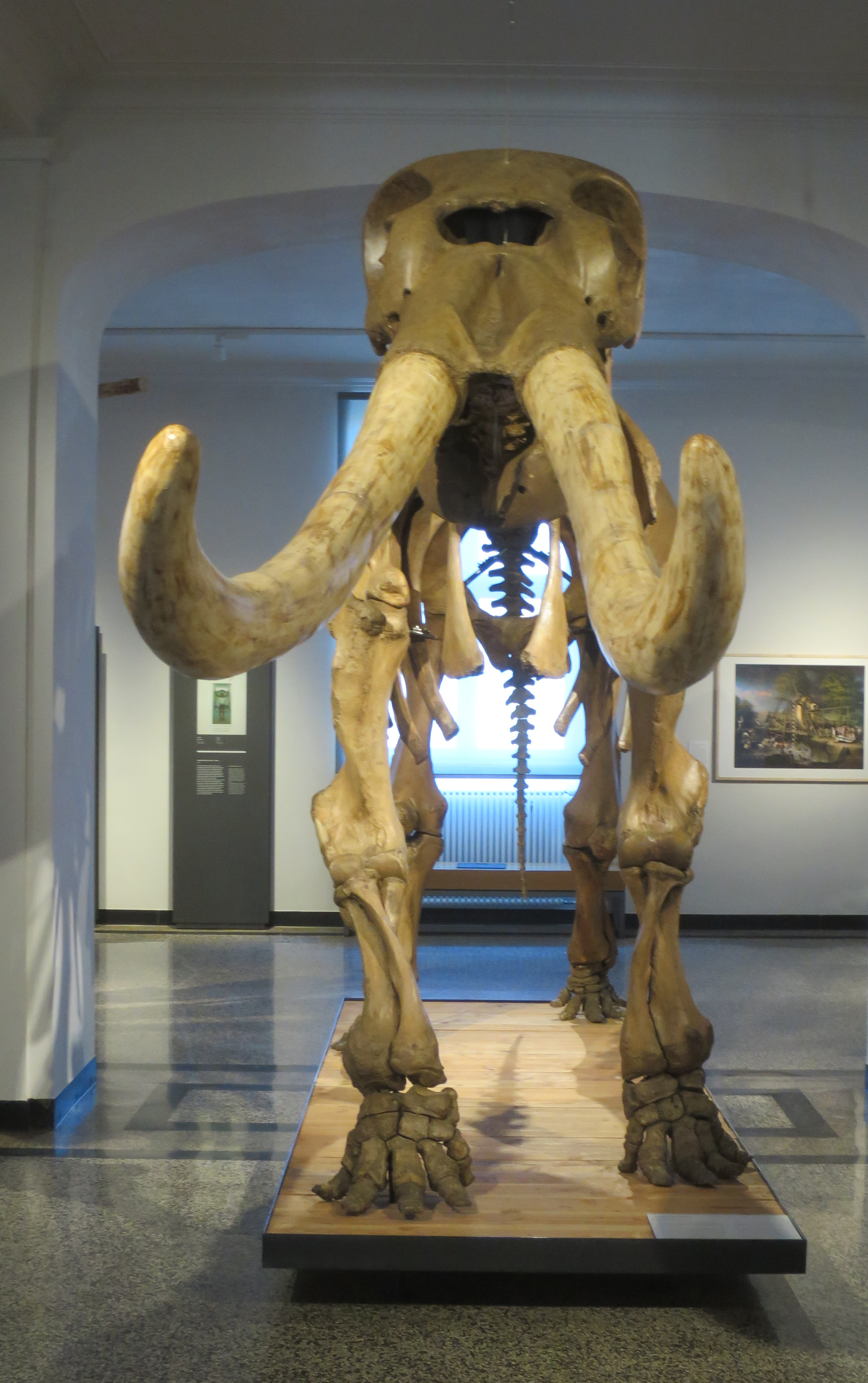
Peale's Mastodon

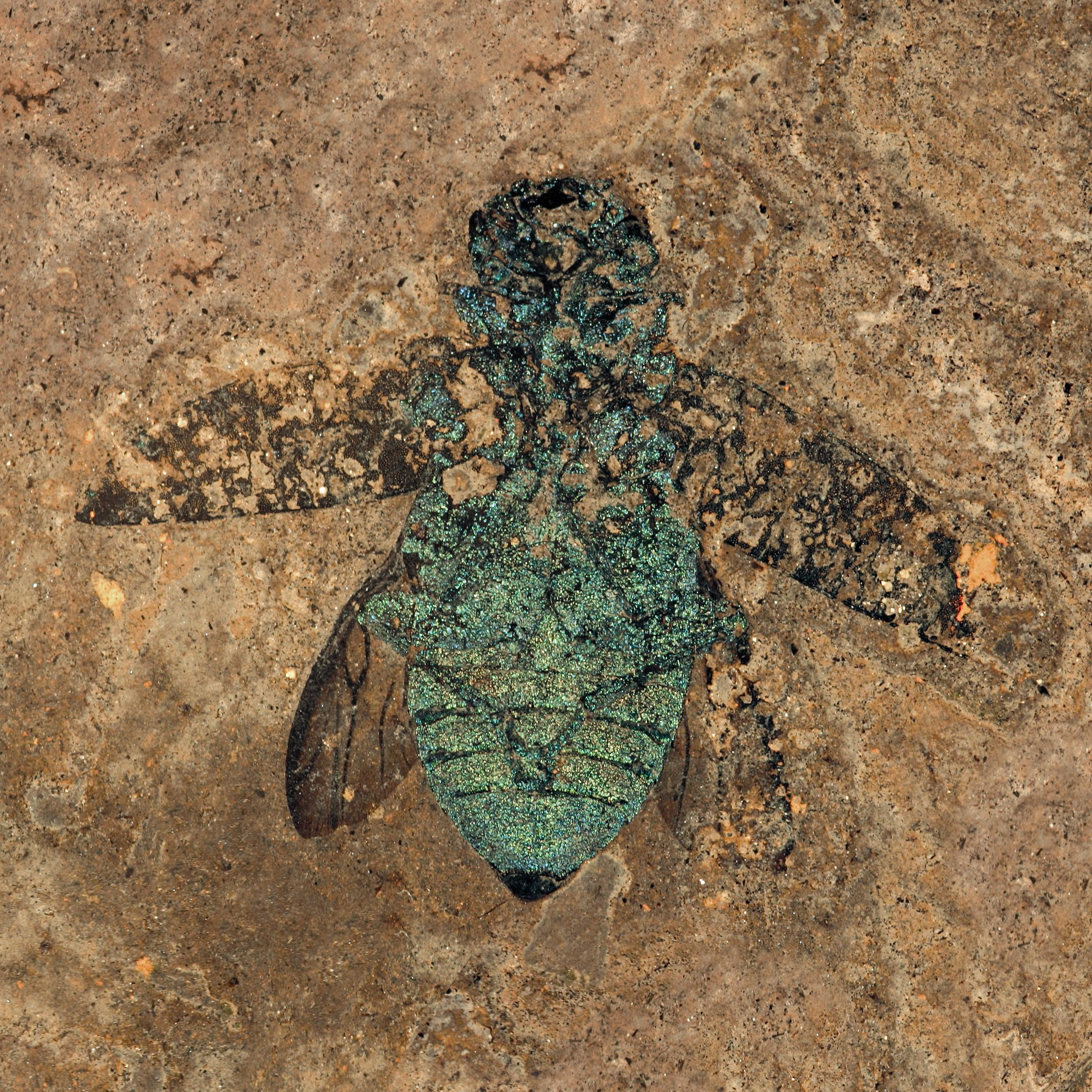
Fossil juwel beetle Buprestidae from Messel pit

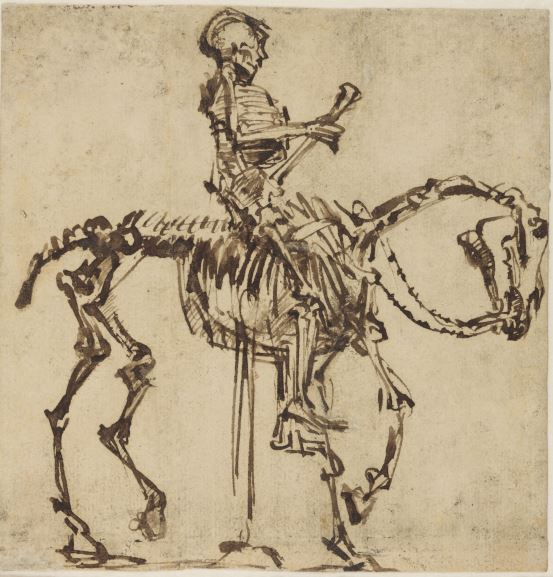
Study room: Rembrandt Harmenszoon van Rijn, Skeleton Rider, c. 1655, pen and ink in brown

== Special exhibitions ==
The museum regularly hosts temporary special exhibitions at Großer Saal.

- 2002 Ausstellung Wüste Darmstadt
- 2014 Ausstellung "Karl der Große 1200 Jahre Mythos und Wirklichkeit" 2014–2015 Darmstadt
- 2015 Zwischen Aufklärung und Romantik : Zeichnungen, Aquarelle und Ölstudien aus der Gründungszeit des Hessischen Landesmuseums Darmstadt
- 2015 Homo expanding worlds – originale Urmenschen-Funde aus fünf Weltregionen
- 2016 Gestaltete Sehnsucht Reiseplakate um 1900
- 2016 Tony Cragg: Unnatural selection
- 2022 Remember Venice! Bernardo Bellotto zeichnet
- 2023 Urknall der Kunst Moderne trifft Vorzeit

== Controversies ==
- 2020 Waste of money for provisional depot
- 2022 Missing art treasures

== See also ==
- 16969 Helamuda
- Peale's Barber Farm Mastodon Exhumation Site
- Grand Duchy of Hesse
- Adolf von Hüpsch

== Films ==
- "Museum check with Markus Brock: Hessisches Landesmuseum Darmstadt. 30 min. First aired: 21 February 2021". 3sat-Mediathek (in German). 27 March 2022.
