= Utricularia inthanonensis =

Scientific classification
- Kingdom: Plantae
- Clade: Tracheophytes
- Clade: Angiosperms
- Clade: Eudicots
- Clade: Asterids
- Order: Lamiales
- Family: Lentibulariaceae
- Genus: Utricularia
- Subgenus: Utricularia subg. Bivalvaria
- Section: Utricularia sect. Phyllaria
- Species: U. inthanonensis

Binomial name
- Utricularia inthanonensis Suksathan & J.Parn.

Species of carnivorous plant

Utricularia inthanonensis is a terrestrial lithophytic carnivorous plant that belongs to the genus Utricularia. It is endemic to northern Thailand in Doi Inthanon National Park where it is only known from the type locality. It grows on moist granite rocks at altitudes around 1,650 m (5,413 ft). It is closely related to U. garrettii, another species endemic to Thailand, and differs from it in corolla, seed, and bladder morphology. Utricularia inthanonensis can also be found growing with U. striatula. It was first formally described by Piyakaset Suksathan (of the Queen Sirikit Botanic Garden) and John Adrian Naicker Parnell (of Trinity College, Dublin) in 2010 from collections made by Suksathan in 2005 and 2007.

== See also ==
- List of Utricularia species
