= Utricularia phusoidaoensis =

Scientific classification
- Kingdom: Plantae
- Clade: Tracheophytes
- Clade: Angiosperms
- Clade: Eudicots
- Clade: Asterids
- Order: Lamiales
- Family: Lentibulariaceae
- Genus: Utricularia
- Subgenus: Utricularia subg. Bivalvaria
- Section: Utricularia sect. Phyllaria
- Species: U. phusoidaoensis

Binomial name
- Utricularia phusoidaoensis Suksathan & J.Parn.

Species of carnivorous plant

Utricularia phusoidaoensis is a terrestrial lithophytic carnivorous plant that belongs to the genus Utricularia. It is endemic to the northern Thailand province of Phitsanulok on Phu Soi Dao, where it is only known from the type locality. It grows on wet cliffs at altitudes around 2,000 m (6,562 ft). It is related to U. garrettii, another species endemic to Thailand that shares a similar seed morphology. Utricularia phusoidaoensis is easily distinguished by its purple 4-6-lobed corolla, reniform leaves, and the staghorn-like trap appendages. It has been found growing in the presence of U. spinomarginata. It was first formally described by Piyakaset Suksathan (of the Queen Sirikit Botanic Garden) and John Adrian Naicker Parnell (of Trinity College, Dublin) in 2010 from collections made by Suksathan in 2007.

== See also ==
- List of Utricularia species
