= Utricularia steenisii =

Scientific classification
- Kingdom: Plantae
- Clade: Tracheophytes
- Clade: Angiosperms
- Clade: Eudicots
- Clade: Asterids
- Order: Lamiales
- Family: Lentibulariaceae
- Genus: Utricularia
- Subgenus: Utricularia subg. Bivalvaria
- Section: Utricularia sect. Phyllaria
- Species: U. steenisii

Binomial name
- Utricularia steenisii P.Taylor

Synonyms
- [U. salwinensis P.Taylor]

Species of carnivorous plant

Utricularia steenisii is a small annual carnivorous plant that belongs to the genus Utricularia. It is endemic to Sumatra and is only known from higher elevations in Aceh. U. steenisii grows as a lithophyte or terrestrial plant among mosses in exposed or shady soils or on rocks at altitudes from 2,500 m (8,202 ft) to 3,200 m (10,499 ft). It was first collected in 1937 by Cornelis Gijsbert Gerrit Jan van Steenis, for whom the species is named. Peter Taylor misidentified a specimen of U. steenisii as U. salwinensis in 1977, but upon viewing further specimens, he realized the nature of this new species and formally described it in 1986.

== See also ==
- List of Utricularia species
