= Soi Dao (disambiguation) =

Soi Dao may refer to:

- Soi Dao district, a district (amphoe) in Chanthaburi Province, Thailand
- Phu Soi Dao, a mountain between Thailand and Laos
  - Phu Soi Dao National Park, a national park in Thailand covering the area
- Khao Soi Dao Nuea or Khao Soi Dao Tai, mountain peaks in Khao Soi Dao Wildlife Sanctuary
