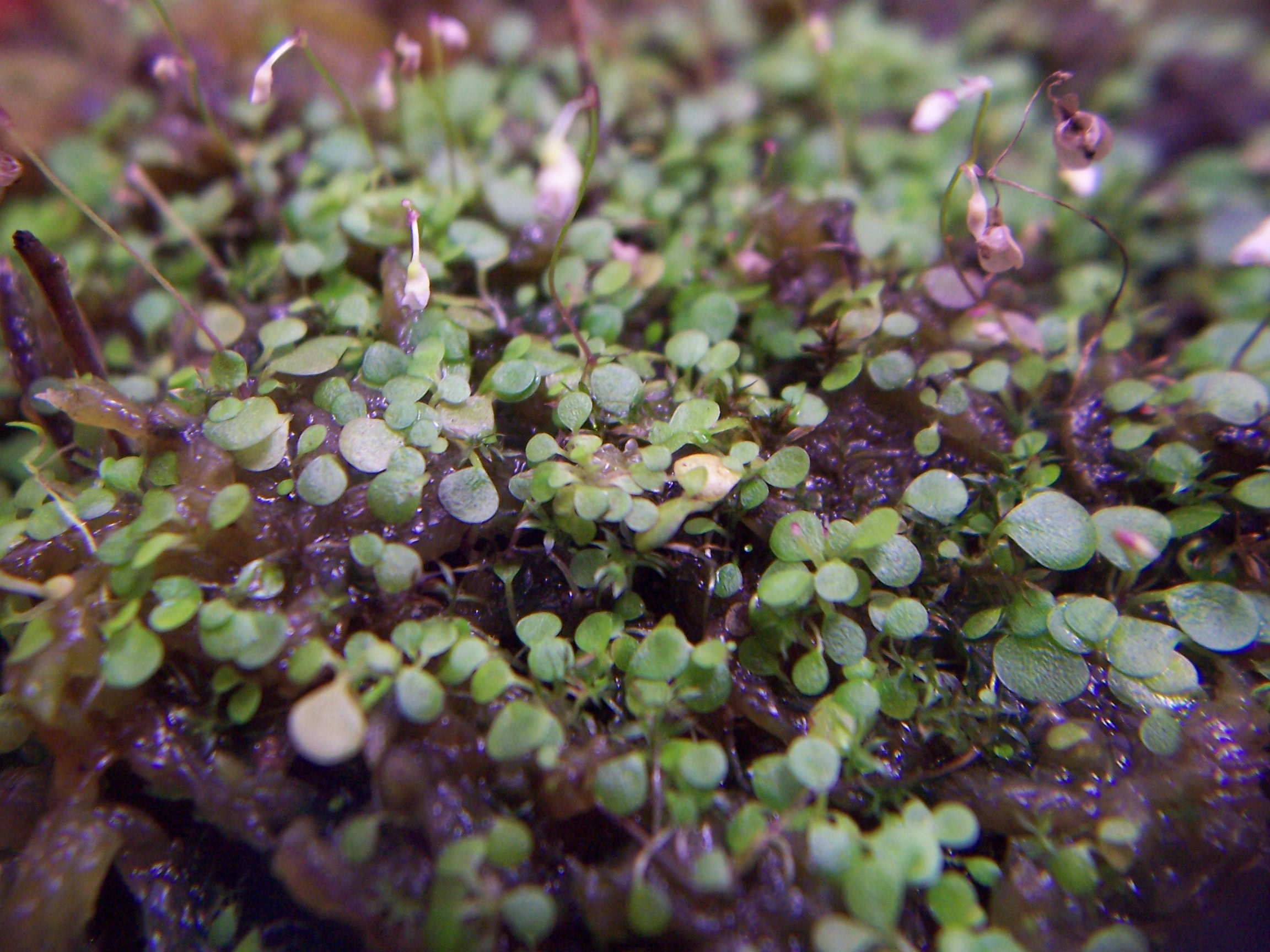
- Utricularia striatula 's leaves

Scientific classification
- Kingdom: Plantae
- Clade: Tracheophytes
- Clade: Angiosperms
- Clade: Eudicots
- Clade: Asterids
- Order: Lamiales
- Family: Lentibulariaceae
- Genus: Utricularia
- Subgenus: Utricularia subg. Bivalvaria
- Section: Utricularia sect. Phyllaria (Kurz) Kamieński

Type species
- U. striatula Sm.

Species
- Utricularia brachiata; Utricularia christopheri; Utricularia corynephora; Utricularia forrestii; Utricularia furcellata; Utricularia garrettii; Utricularia inthanonensis; Utricularia kumaonensis; Utricularia moniliformis; Utricularia multicaulis; Utricularia phusoidaoensis; Utricularia pulchra; Utricularia salwinensis; Utricularia spinomarginata; Utricularia steenisii; Utricularia striatula

Synonyms
- Diurospermum Edgw.; Lemnopsis Zippel; Meloneura Raf.; Utricularia sect. Meloneura (Raf.) Komiya; Utricularia subg. Phyllaria Kurz

= Utricularia sect. Phyllaria =

Group of carnivorous plants

Utricularia sect. Phyllaria is a section in the genus Utricularia. The sixteen species in this section are small or very small lithophytic or epiphytic carnivorous plants native to the mountains of Asia, ranging from India to China and New Guinea. One species, Utricularia striatula, is an exception and is widespread in much of the Old World tropics. Wilhelm Sulpiz Kurz originally described and published this section as Utricularia subg. Phyllaria in 1874. Franciszek Kamieński reviewed the genus in 1891 and reduced Kunz's subgenus to a section. Later botanists, including Peter Taylor, agreed with Kamieński's assessment. In Taylor's 1986 revision of the genus, he placed this section in subgenus Utricularia. Later molecular data resulted in the revision of Taylor's treatment, reinstating subgenus Bivalvaria and placing this section within it.

== See also ==
- List of Utricularia species
