= Utricularia spinomarginata =

Scientific classification
- Kingdom: Plantae
- Clade: Tracheophytes
- Clade: Angiosperms
- Clade: Eudicots
- Clade: Asterids
- Order: Lamiales
- Family: Lentibulariaceae
- Genus: Utricularia
- Subgenus: Utricularia subg. Bivalvaria
- Section: Utricularia sect. Phyllaria
- Species: U. spinomarginata

Binomial name
- Utricularia spinomarginata Suksathan & J.Parn.

Species of carnivorous plant

Utricularia spinomarginata is a terrestrial lithophytic carnivorous plant that belongs to the genus Utricularia. It is endemic to the northern Thailand province of Phitsanulok on Phu Soi Dao, where it is only known from the type locality. It grows on wet cliffs at altitudes around 2,000 m (6,562 ft). Utricularia spinomarginata is easily distinguished from other members of section Phyllaria by its deeply dissected yellow-white to pink-white 5-lobed corollas and the marginal spine-like hairs on the obovoid seeds. It has been found growing in the presence of U. phusoidaoensis. It was first formally described by Piyakaset Suksathan (of the Queen Sirikit Botanic Garden) and John Adrian Naicker Parnell (of Trinity College, Dublin) in 2010 from collections made by Suksathan in 2007.

== See also ==
- List of Utricularia species
