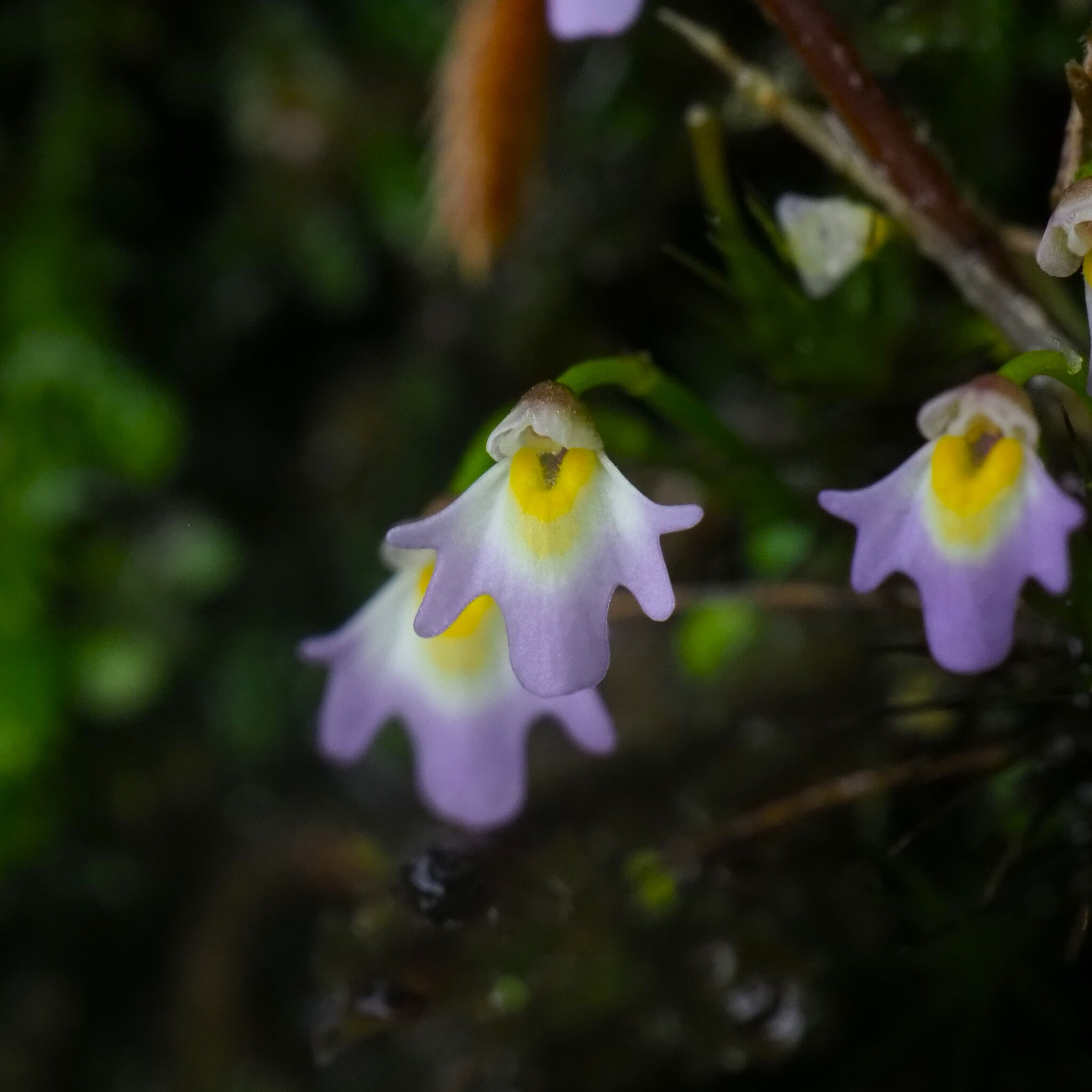
- In China

Scientific classification
- Kingdom: Plantae
- Clade: Tracheophytes
- Clade: Angiosperms
- Clade: Eudicots
- Clade: Asterids
- Order: Lamiales
- Family: Lentibulariaceae
- Genus: Utricularia
- Subgenus: Utricularia subg. Bivalvaria
- Section: Utricularia sect. Phyllaria
- Species: U. kumaonensis

Binomial name
- Utricularia kumaonensis Oliv.

Synonyms
- Diurospermum album Edgew.; [Utricularia multicaulis P.Taylor]

= Utricularia kumaonensis =

Species of carnivorous plant

Utricularia kumaonensis is a small annual carnivorous plant that belongs to the genus Utricularia. It is native to Bhutan, northern Burma, the Yunnan province of China, India, and Nepal. U. kumaonensis grows as a lithophyte, epiphyte, or terrestrial plant on mossy rocks or in bog grasslands at altitudes from 2,250 m (7,382 ft) to 4,200 m (13,780 ft). It was originally described by Daniel Oliver in 1859, although Peter Taylor asserted in his 1989 monograph that Michael Pakenham Edgeworth's 1847 description of Diurospermum album is U. kumaonensis. It is very similar to U. multicaulis.

The Latin specific epithet kumaonensis refers to Kumaon (a former kingdom) in Uttarakhand, India.

== See also ==
- List of Utricularia species
