= Utricularia moniliformis =

Scientific classification
- Kingdom: Plantae
- Clade: Tracheophytes
- Clade: Angiosperms
- Clade: Eudicots
- Clade: Asterids
- Order: Lamiales
- Family: Lentibulariaceae
- Genus: Utricularia
- Subgenus: Utricularia subg. Bivalvaria
- Section: Utricularia sect. Phyllaria
- Species: U. moniliformis

Binomial name
- Utricularia moniliformis P.Taylor

Synonyms
- [U. orbiculata Thwaites]

Species of carnivorous plant

Utricularia moniliformis is a small perennial carnivorous plant that belongs to the genus Utricularia. It is endemic to Sri Lanka. U. moniliformis grows as a lithophyte on wet rocks at altitudes from 750 m (2,461 ft) to 2,300 m (7,546 ft). It was formally described as a species by Peter Taylor in 1986, although it was first recorded as U. orbiculata by George Henry Kendrick Thwaites in 1860 and later by Karl Immanuel Eberhard Goebel in 1890.

== See also ==
- List of Utricularia species
