= Utricularia pulchra =

Scientific classification
- Kingdom: Plantae
- Clade: Tracheophytes
- Clade: Angiosperms
- Clade: Eudicots
- Clade: Asterids
- Order: Lamiales
- Family: Lentibulariaceae
- Genus: Utricularia
- Subgenus: Utricularia subg. Bivalvaria
- Section: Utricularia sect. Phyllaria
- Species: U. pulchra

Binomial name
- Utricularia pulchra P.Taylor

Synonyms
- [U. striatula Ridl.]

Species of carnivorous plant

Utricularia pulchra is a small, probably annual, carnivorous plant that belongs to the genus Utricularia. It is endemic to New Guinea. U. pulchra grows as a lithophyte or terrestrial plant among mosses in wet sand or rocks and on wet cliffs at altitudes from 2,250 m (7,382 ft) to 3,100 m (10,171 ft). It was originally described by Peter Taylor in 1977.

== See also ==
- List of Utricularia species
