= Utricularia corynephora =

Scientific classification
- Kingdom: Plantae
- Clade: Tracheophytes
- Clade: Angiosperms
- Clade: Eudicots
- Clade: Asterids
- Order: Lamiales
- Family: Lentibulariaceae
- Genus: Utricularia
- Subgenus: Utricularia subg. Bivalvaria
- Section: Utricularia sect. Phyllaria
- Species: U. corynephora

Binomial name
- Utricularia corynephora P.Taylor

Species of carnivorous plant

Utricularia corynephora is a small, probably perennial, carnivorous plant that belongs to the genus Utricularia. Its native distribution includes Burma and Thailand and is only known from the type specimen from the southern peninsula of Burma and from a collection on the adjacent peninsula in Thailand. U. corynephora grows as a lithophyte on wet granite rock faces at altitudes from 180 m (591 ft) to 750 m (2,461 ft). It was originally described by Peter Taylor in 1986.

== See also ==
- List of Utricularia species
