= Utricularia furcellata =

Scientific classification
- Kingdom: Plantae
- Clade: Tracheophytes
- Clade: Angiosperms
- Clade: Eudicots
- Clade: Asterids
- Order: Lamiales
- Family: Lentibulariaceae
- Genus: Utricularia
- Subgenus: Utricularia subg. Bivalvaria
- Section: Utricularia sect. Phyllaria
- Species: U. furcellata

Binomial name
- Utricularia furcellata Oliv.

Synonyms
- U. furcellata var. minor C.B.Clarke

Species of carnivorous plant

Utricularia furcellata is a small annual carnivorous plant that belongs to the genus Utricularia. It is native to northeast India and Thailand, suggesting that it may also occur in suitable habitats in the regions in between. U. furcellata grows as a lithophyte on moist rocks at altitudes from 1,500 m (4,921 ft) to 2,700 m (8,858 ft). It was originally described by Daniel Oliver in 1859.

== See also ==
- List of Utricularia species
