= Utricularia christopheri =

Scientific classification
- Kingdom: Plantae
- Clade: Tracheophytes
- Clade: Angiosperms
- Clade: Eudicots
- Clade: Asterids
- Order: Lamiales
- Family: Lentibulariaceae
- Genus: Utricularia
- Subgenus: Utricularia subg. Bivalvaria
- Section: Utricularia sect. Phyllaria
- Species: U. christopheri

Binomial name
- Utricularia christopheri P.Taylor

Species of carnivorous plant

Utricularia christopheri is a small perennial carnivorous plant that belongs to the genus Utricularia. It is endemic to the Himalaya region and includes distributions in Sikkim, India and Nepal. U. christopheri grows as a lithophyte among bryophytes on rocks at altitudes from 3,600 m (11,811 ft) to 3,900 m (12,795 ft). It was originally described by Peter Taylor in 1986.

== See also ==
- List of Utricularia species
