= Utricularia forrestii =

Scientific classification
- Kingdom: Plantae
- Clade: Tracheophytes
- Clade: Angiosperms
- Clade: Eudicots
- Clade: Asterids
- Order: Lamiales
- Family: Lentibulariaceae
- Genus: Utricularia
- Subgenus: Utricularia subg. Bivalvaria
- Section: Utricularia sect. Phyllaria
- Species: U. forrestii

Binomial name
- Utricularia forrestii P.Taylor

Species of carnivorous plant

Utricularia forrestii is a small perennial carnivorous plant that belongs to the genus Utricularia. Its native distribution includes northern Burma and western China. It is represented in herberia by only four specimens. U. forrestii grows as a lithophyte on rocks among mosses at altitudes from 2,100 m (6,890 ft) to 3,000 m (9,843 ft). It was originally described by Peter Taylor in 1986 and named in honor of George Forrest.

== See also ==
- List of Utricularia species
