= Utricularia brachiata =

Scientific classification
- Kingdom: Plantae
- Clade: Tracheophytes
- Clade: Angiosperms
- Clade: Eudicots
- Clade: Asterids
- Order: Lamiales
- Family: Lentibulariaceae
- Genus: Utricularia
- Subgenus: Utricularia subg. Bivalvaria
- Section: Utricularia sect. Phyllaria
- Species: U. brachiata

Binomial name
- Utricularia brachiata Oliv.

Species of carnivorous plant

Utricularia brachiata is a small perennial carnivorous plant that belongs to the genus Utricularia. Its native distribution ranges from the Eastern Himalaya region to Yunnan. U. brachiata grows as a lithophyte among bryophytes on rocks at altitudes from 2,600 m (8,530 ft) to 4,200 m (13,780 ft). It was originally described by Daniel Oliver in 1859.

== See also ==
- List of Utricularia species
