= Phu Soi Dao =

Mountain on the Lao-Thai border

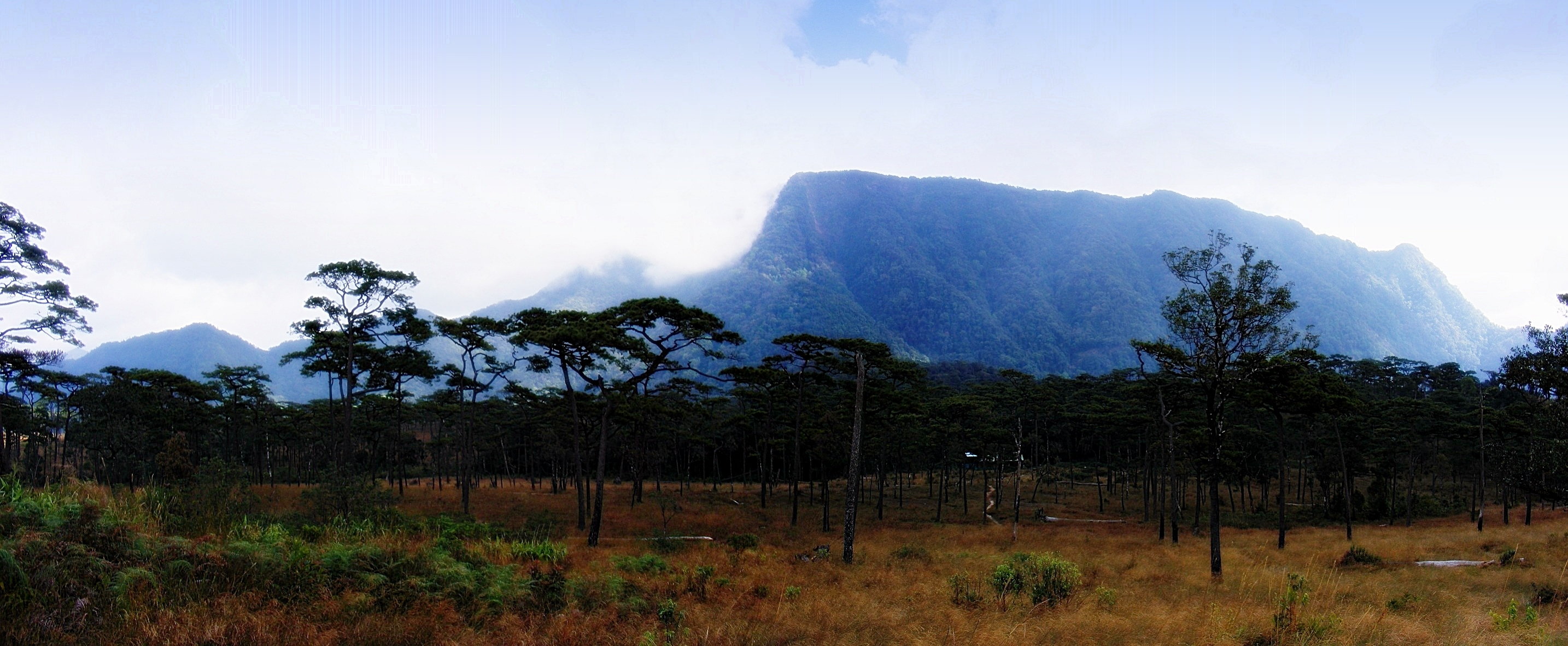
- Phu Soi Dao Mountain seen from Thailand

Highest point
- Elevation: 2,120 m (6,960 ft)
- Prominence: 1,664 m (5,459 ft)
- Listing: Ultra; Ribu; List of mountains in Thailand
- Coordinates: 17°44′N 101°00′E

Geography
- Location within Thailand
- Location: Lao – Thai border
- Parent range: Luang Prabang Range

Phu Soi Dao (French: Phou Soai Dao) is a mountain in Southeast Asia. It is 2,120 metres (6,960 ft) tall and rises at the south end of the Luang Prabang Range, on the border between Laos and Thailand. Phu Soi Dao National Park is on the Thai side of the range in Phitsanulok and Uttaradit Provinces.

Pinus kesiya, Betula alnoides, Schima wallichii and Shorea siamensis are among the species of trees present in the forest. Utricularia spinomarginata and Utricularia phusoidaoensis are endemic plants on Phu Soi Dao. There are numerous waterfalls in the range area.

== See also ==
- List of mountains in Thailand
- List of ultras of Southeast Asia
- Thai–Laotian Border War
