= Utricularia garrettii =

Scientific classification
- Kingdom: Plantae
- Clade: Tracheophytes
- Clade: Angiosperms
- Clade: Eudicots
- Clade: Asterids
- Order: Lamiales
- Family: Lentibulariaceae
- Genus: Utricularia
- Subgenus: Utricularia subg. Bivalvaria
- Section: Utricularia sect. Phyllaria
- Species: U. garrettii

Binomial name
- Utricularia garrettii P.Taylor

Species of carnivorous plant

Utricularia garrettii is a small perennial carnivorous plant that belongs to the genus Utricularia. It is endemic to Thailand where it is only known from the type locality and represented by a single specimen. U. garrettii grows as a lithophyte on moist rocks at altitudes around 2,175 m (7,136 ft). It was originally described by Peter Taylor in 1986 from a collection by H. B. G. Garrett in 1910. As of Taylor's 1989 revision of his monograph, it had not been recollected since Garrett's original collection. It is most similar to U. striatula and can be easily confused for it.

== See also ==
- List of Utricularia species
