= Utricularia multicaulis =

Scientific classification
- Kingdom: Plantae
- Clade: Tracheophytes
- Clade: Angiosperms
- Clade: Eudicots
- Clade: Asterids
- Order: Lamiales
- Family: Lentibulariaceae
- Genus: Utricularia
- Subgenus: Utricularia subg. Bivalvaria
- Section: Utricularia sect. Phyllaria
- Species: U. multicaulis

Binomial name
- Utricularia multicaulis Oliv.

Species of carnivorous plant

Utricularia multicaulis is a very small annual carnivorous plant that belongs to the genus Utricularia. It is native to Bhutan, Burma, China, India, and Nepal. U. multicaulis grows as a lithophyte or terrestrial plant on wet rocks or open swampy meadows with mosses at altitudes from 1,800 m (5,906 ft) to 4,000 m (13,123 ft). It was originally described by Daniel Oliver in 1859.

== See also ==
- List of Utricularia species
