= Utricularia salwinensis =

Scientific classification
- Kingdom: Plantae
- Clade: Tracheophytes
- Clade: Angiosperms
- Clade: Eudicots
- Clade: Asterids
- Order: Lamiales
- Family: Lentibulariaceae
- Genus: Utricularia
- Subgenus: Utricularia subg. Bivalvaria
- Section: Utricularia sect. Phyllaria
- Species: U. salwinensis

Binomial name
- Utricularia salwinensis Hand.-Mazz.

Species of carnivorous plant

Utricularia salwinensis is a small, probably perennial, carnivorous plant that belongs to the genus Utricularia. It is endemic to China and is only known from the type location in northwestern Yunnan and two other collections in southeastern Xizang (Tibet). U. salwinensis grows as a lithophyte or terrestrial plant among mosses on wet cliffs or in bogs at altitudes from 3,275 m (10,745 ft) to 4,000 m (13,123 ft). It was originally described by Heinrich Handel-Mazzetti in 1936.

== See also ==
- List of Utricularia species
