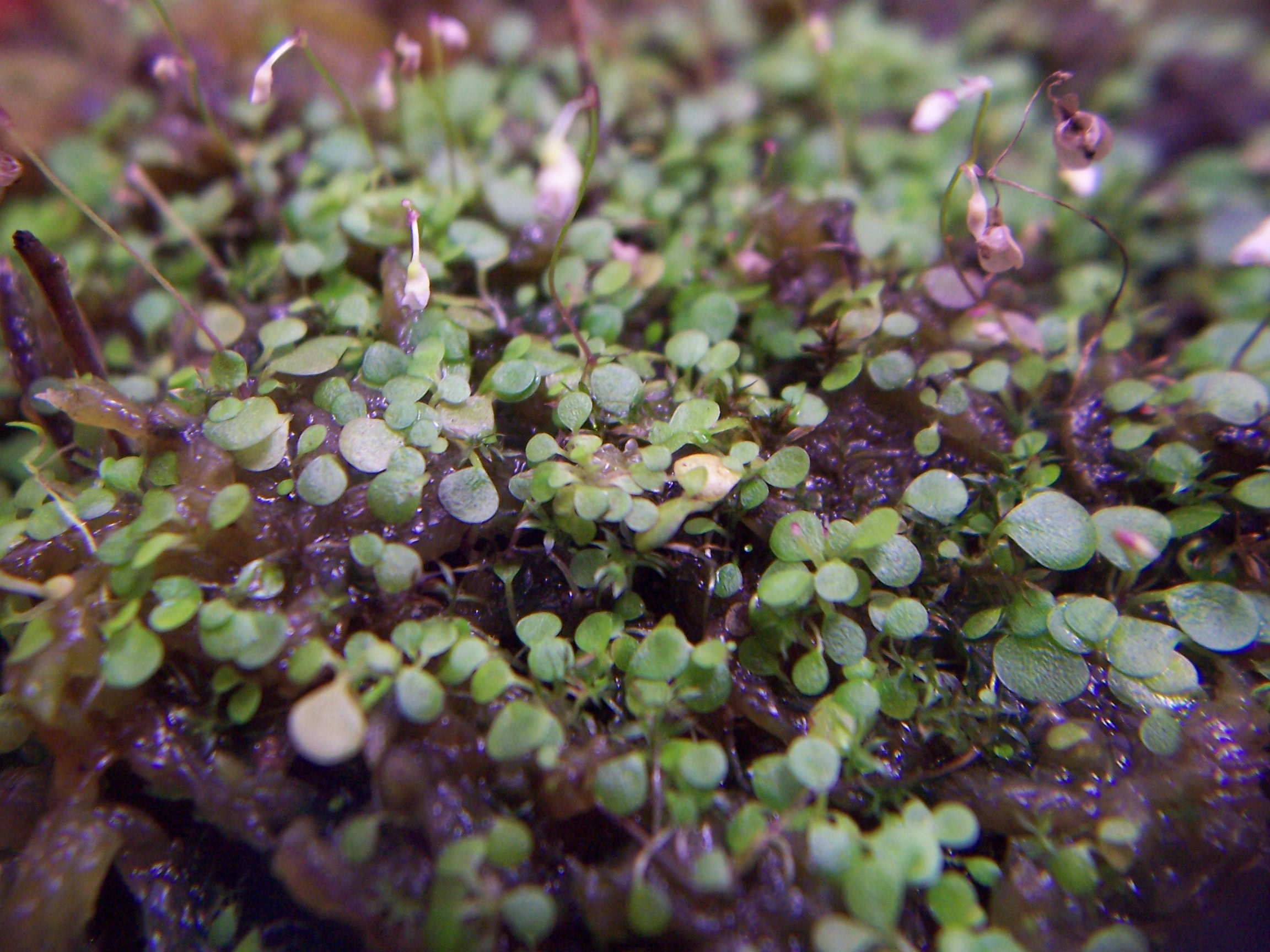

Scientific classification
- Kingdom: Plantae
- Clade: Tracheophytes
- Clade: Angiosperms
- Clade: Eudicots
- Clade: Asterids
- Order: Lamiales
- Family: Lentibulariaceae
- Genus: Utricularia
- Subgenus: Utricularia subg. Bivalvaria
- Section: Utricularia sect. Phyllaria
- Species: U. striatula

Binomial name
- Utricularia striatula Sm.

Synonyms
- Lemnopsis mnioides Zippel; Meloneura purpurea Raf.; M. striatula (Sm.) Barnhart; Utricularia anthropophora Ridl.; [U. furcellata Pellegr.; U. glochidiata Wight; U. harlandii Oliv. ex Benth.; U. orbiculata Wall.; U. philetas R.D.Good; U. pusilla J.Graham; U. rosulata Benj.; U. striatula var. minor Ridl.; U. taikankoensis Yamamoto

= Utricularia striatula =

Species of carnivorous plant

Utricularia striatula is a small carnivorous plant that belongs to the genus Utricularia. It is widespread from tropical Africa to New Guinea. U. striatula grows as a lithophyte or epiphyte on wet rocks or tree trunks at altitudes from near sea level to 3,300 m (10,827 ft). It was originally described by James Edward Smith in 1819.

== See also ==
- List of Utricularia species
