= Hermann Zippel and Carl Bollmann =

German botanists

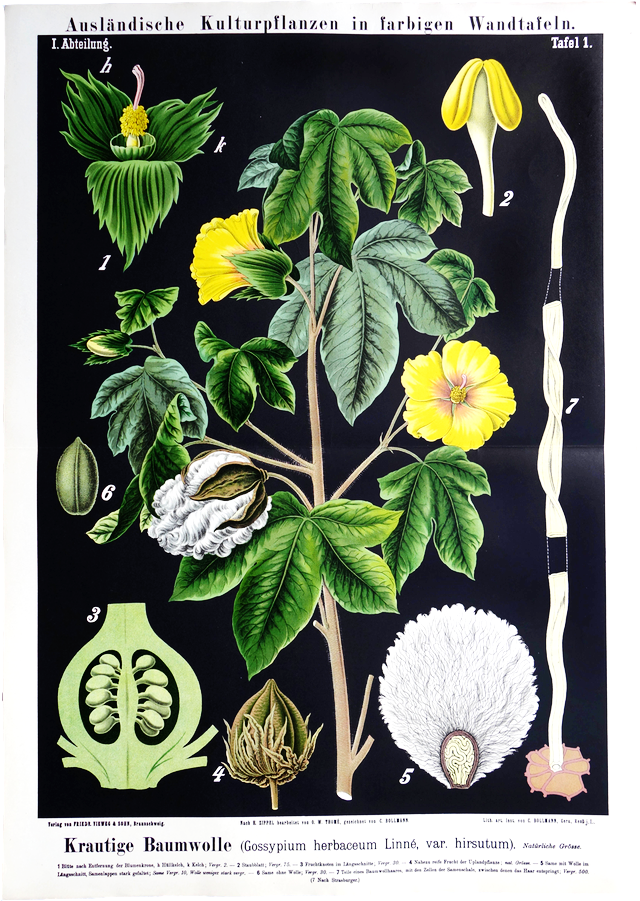
Gossypium herbaceum

Hermann Zippel and Carl Bollmann were responsible for the publication of a number of series of botanical educational wall charts between 1876 and 1899 in Germany. Ausländische Kulturpflanzen in farbigen Wandtafeln mit erläuterndem Text ('Exotic crop plants in colourful wall charts with explanatory text') was a volume published at the same time as the wall charts. The wall charts depicted crop plants unknown at the time in most of Europe. Hermann Zippel was a teacher of botany at a girls' high school in Gera, while Carl Bollmann, was an artist who taught printmaking at the same school.

The charts were published in four editions by Friedrich Vieweg & Sohn, of Braunschweig, Germany. They appeared in three series - "Ausländischen Culturpflanzen in bunten Wand-Tafeln", "Repräsentanten einheimischer Pflanzenfamilien", and the final "Ausländische Kulturpflanzen in farbigen Wandtafeln". Zippel and Bollmann made use of a black background for the illustrations of the 'Ausländische Kulturpflanzen', effectively bringing out the details. The size of these charts was 60 x 75 cm, a few charts appearing in a larger format of 120 x 75 cm. Specimens for the charts were obtained from the Leipzig Botanical Garden and from herbaria.

Zippel also published Ausländische Handels- und Nährpflanzen zur Belehrung für das Haus und zum Selbstunterrichte in 1885.

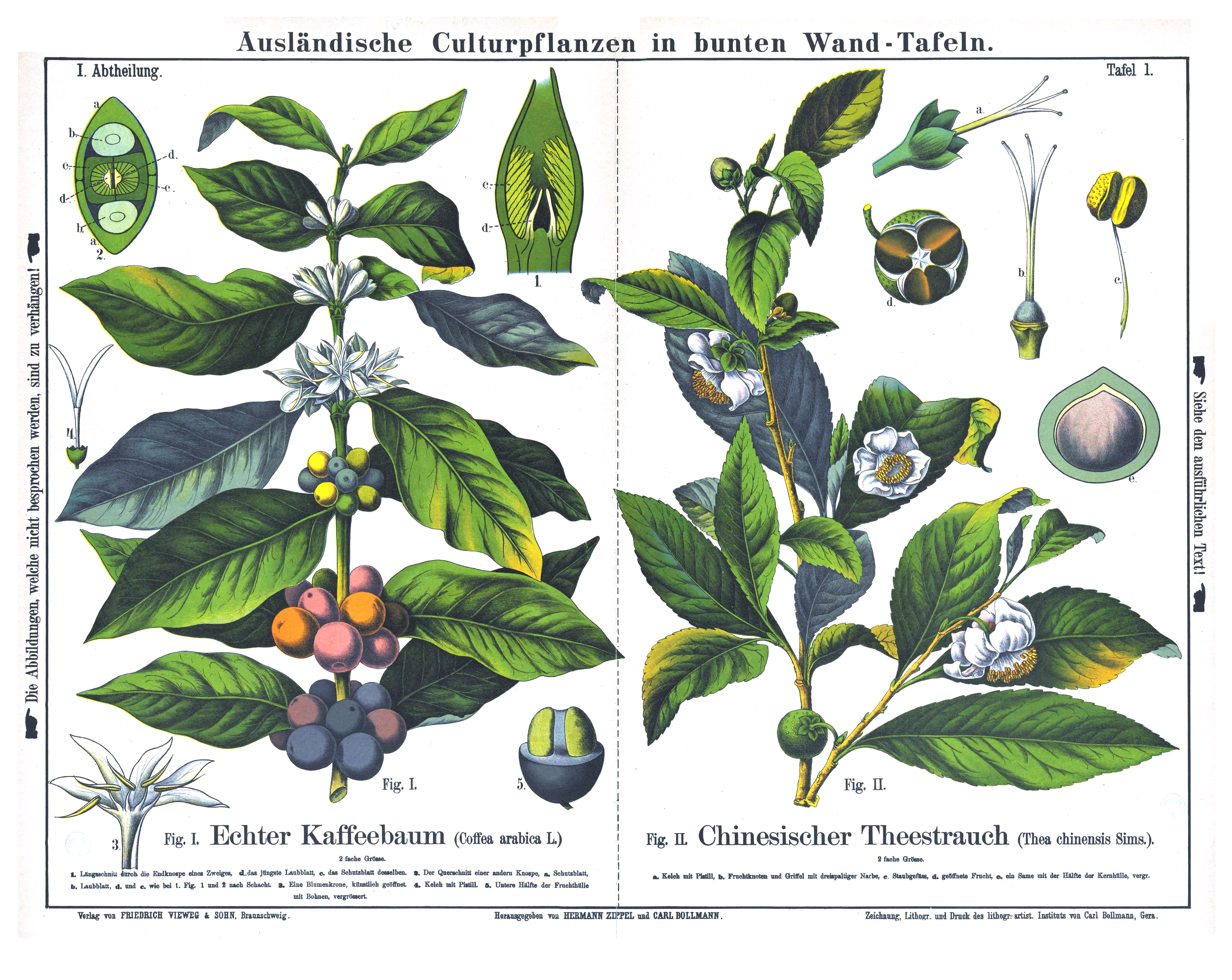

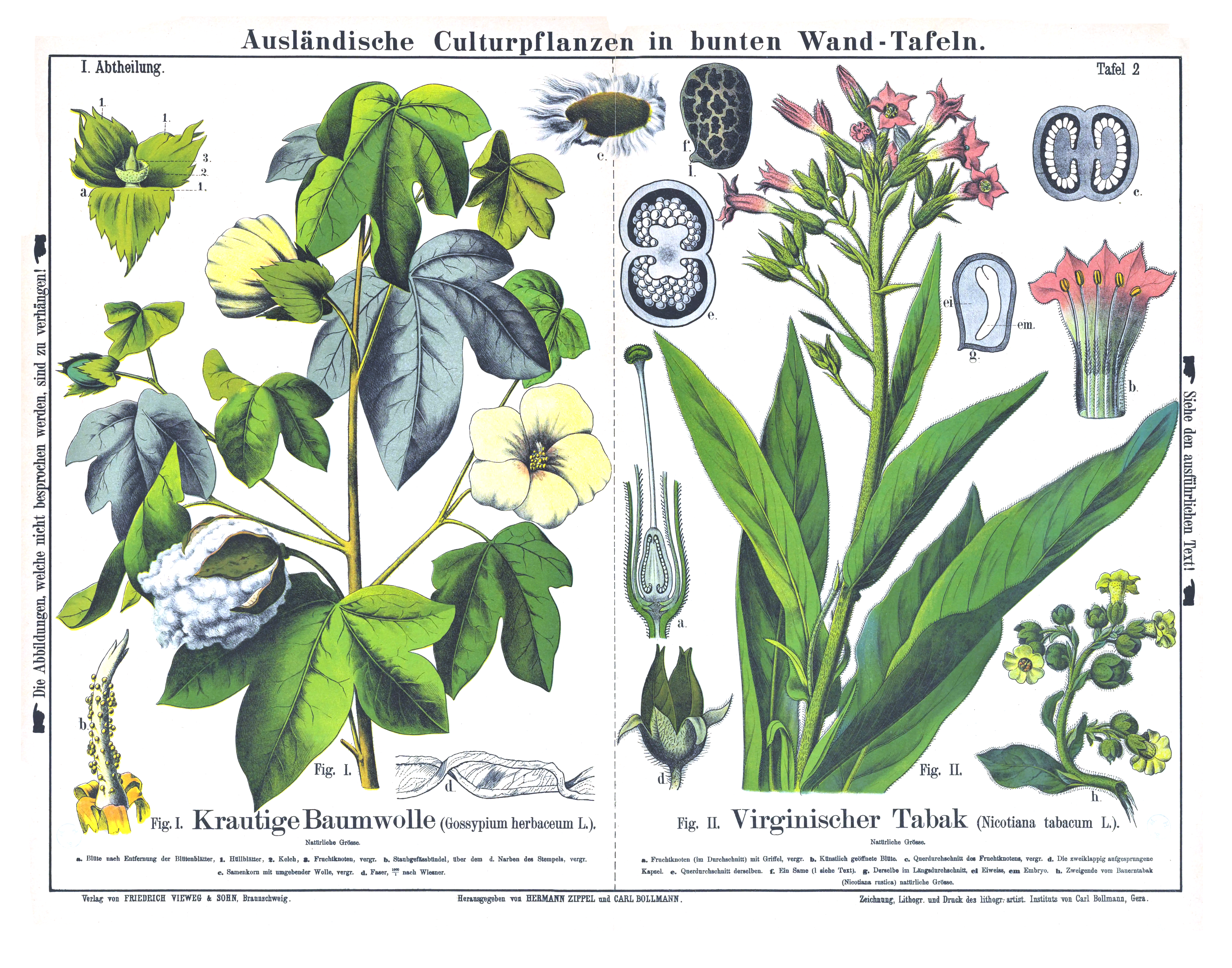

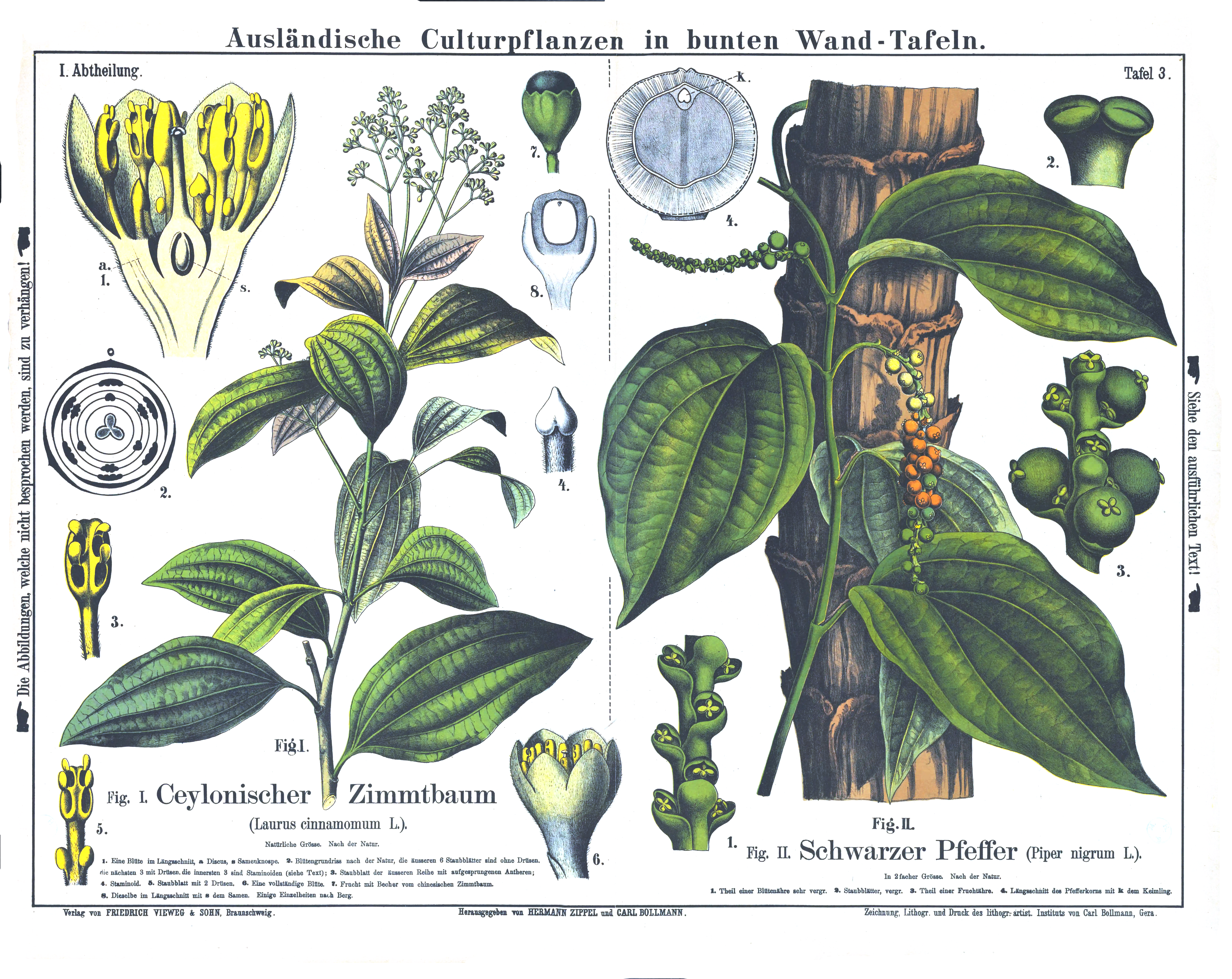

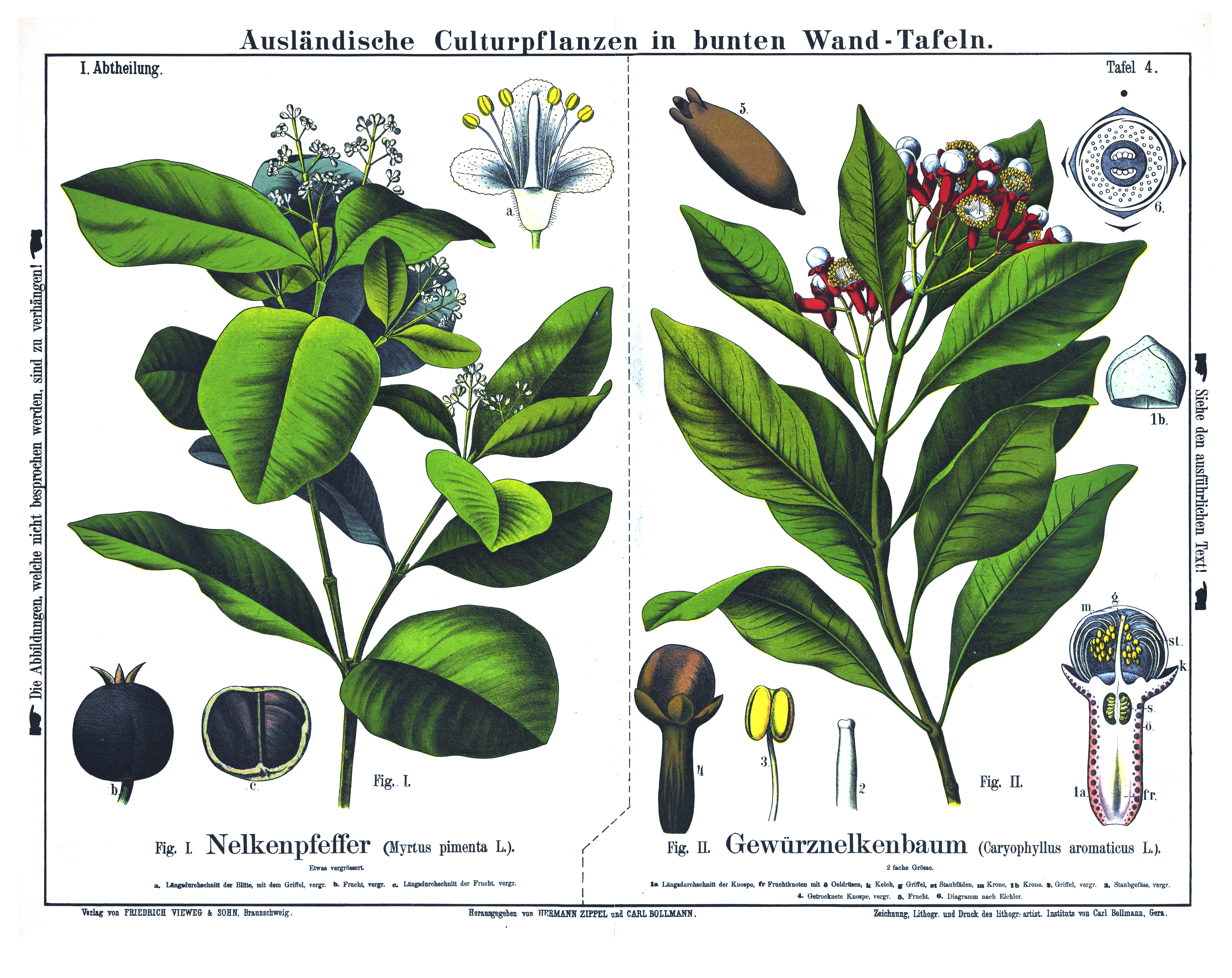

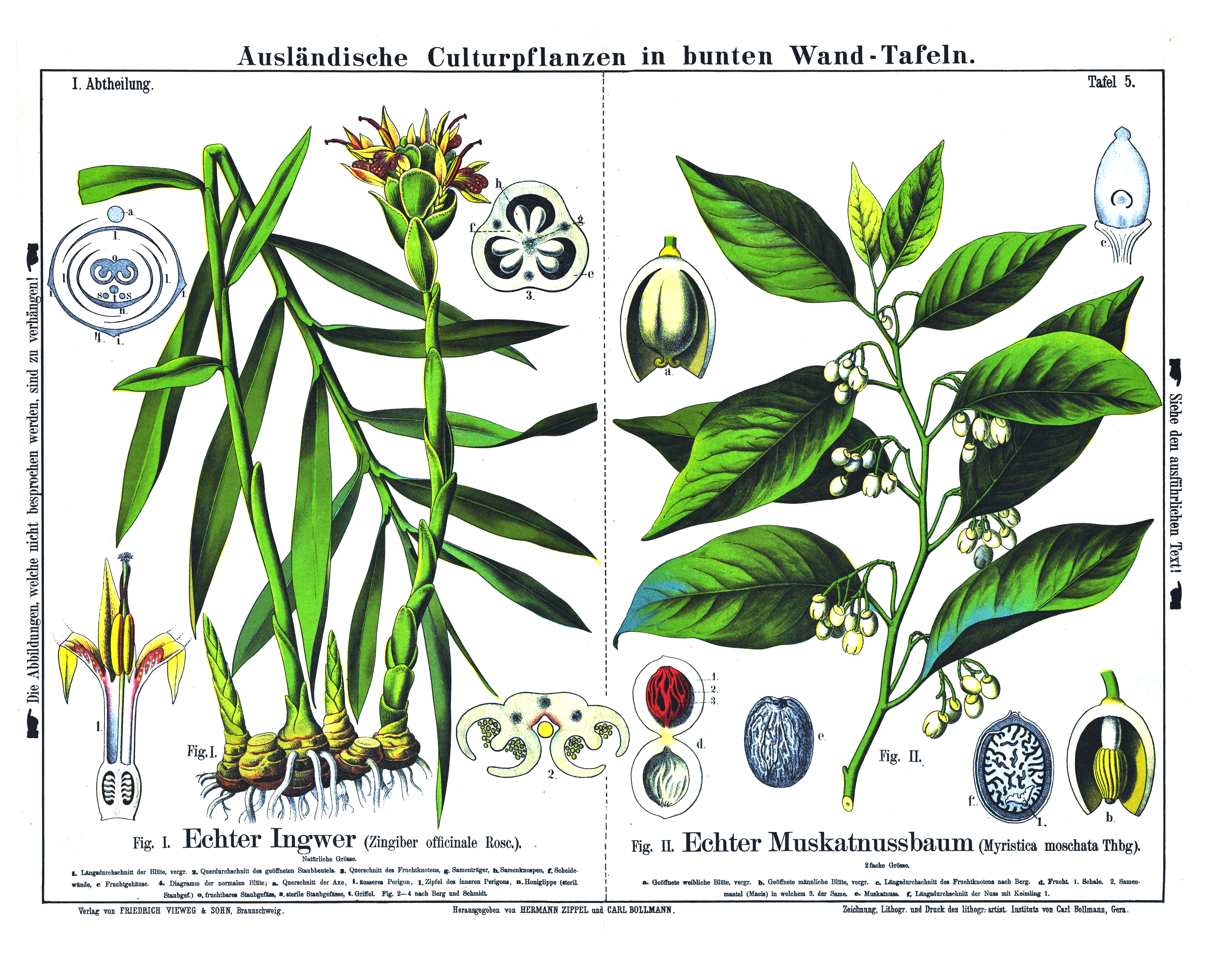

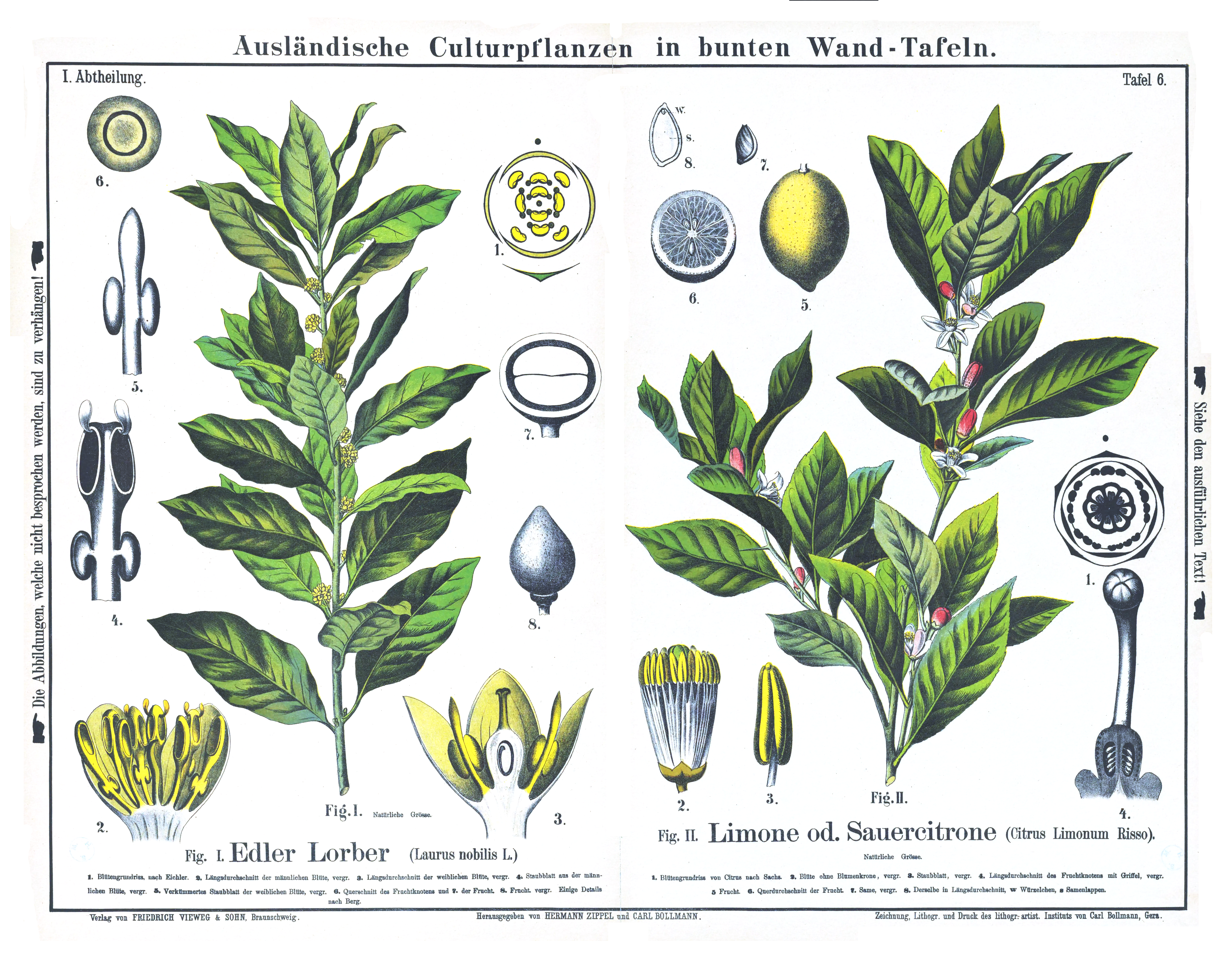

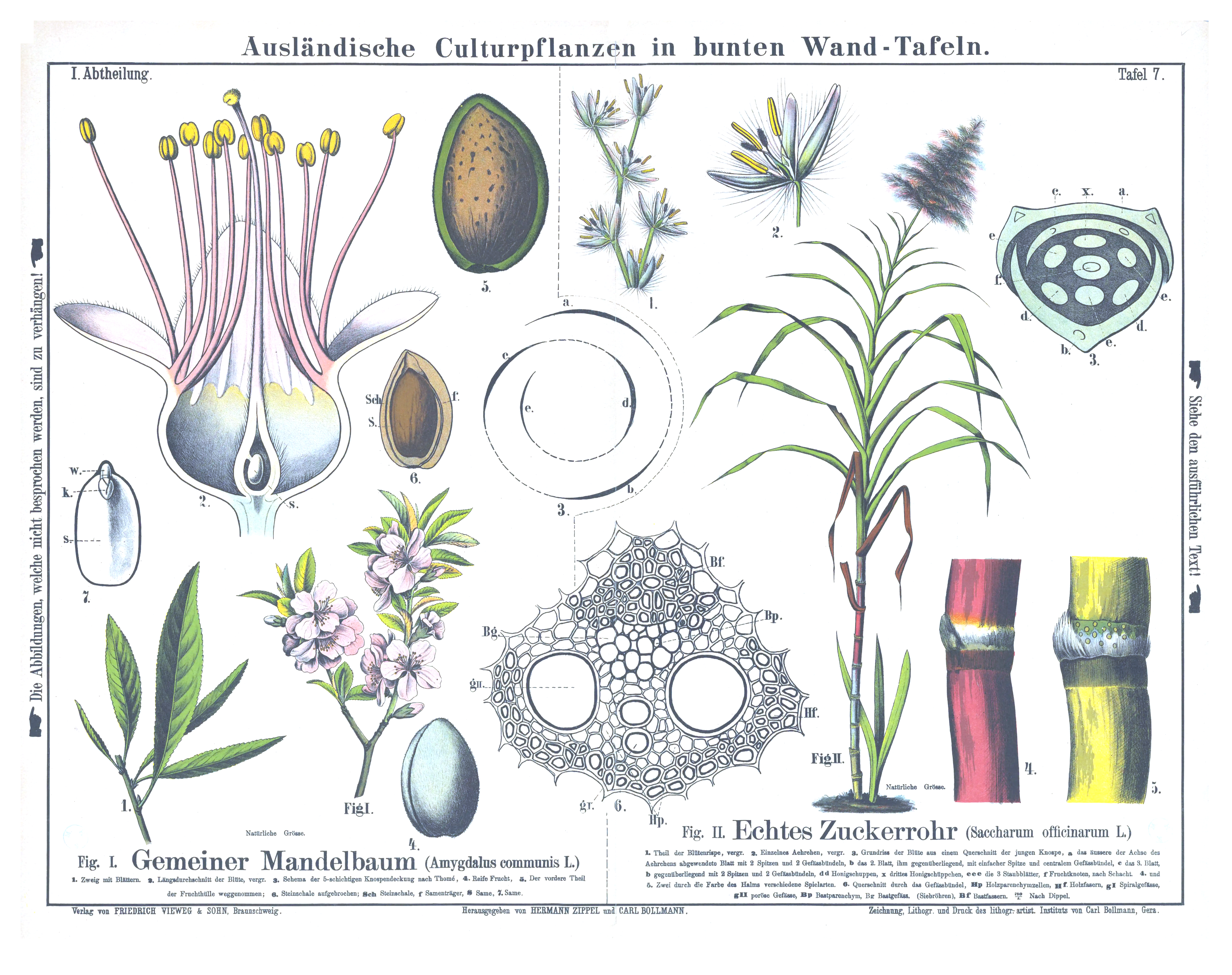

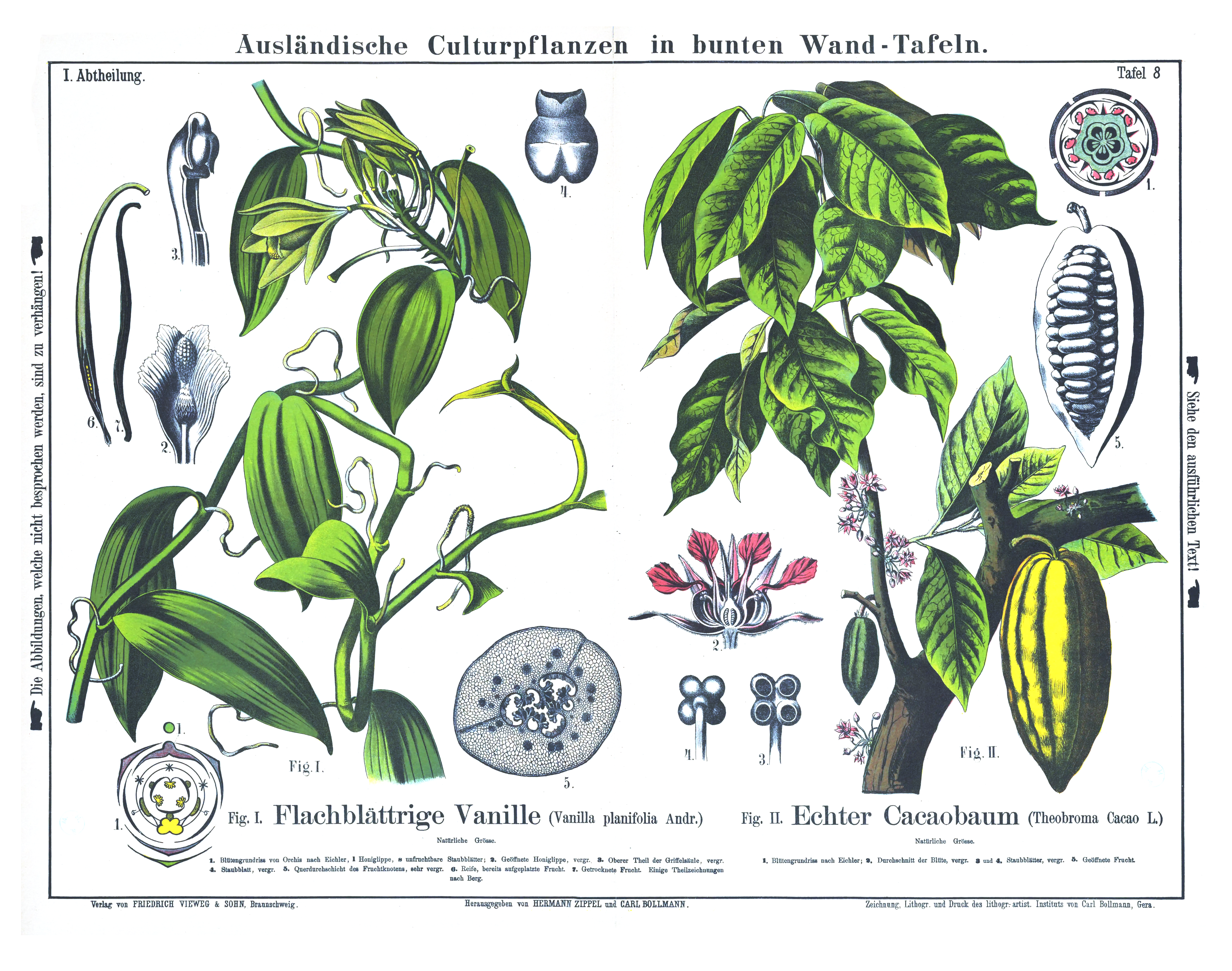

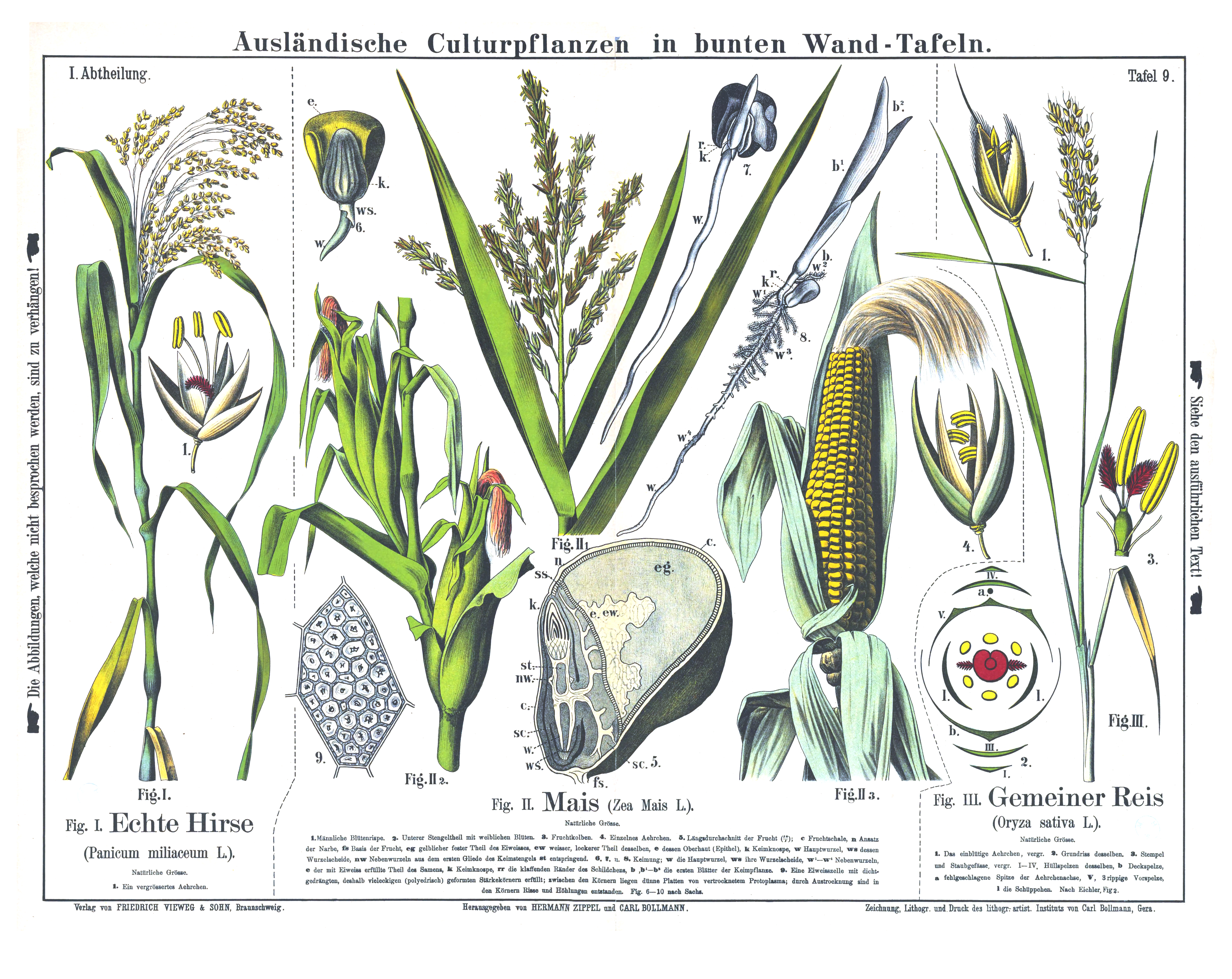

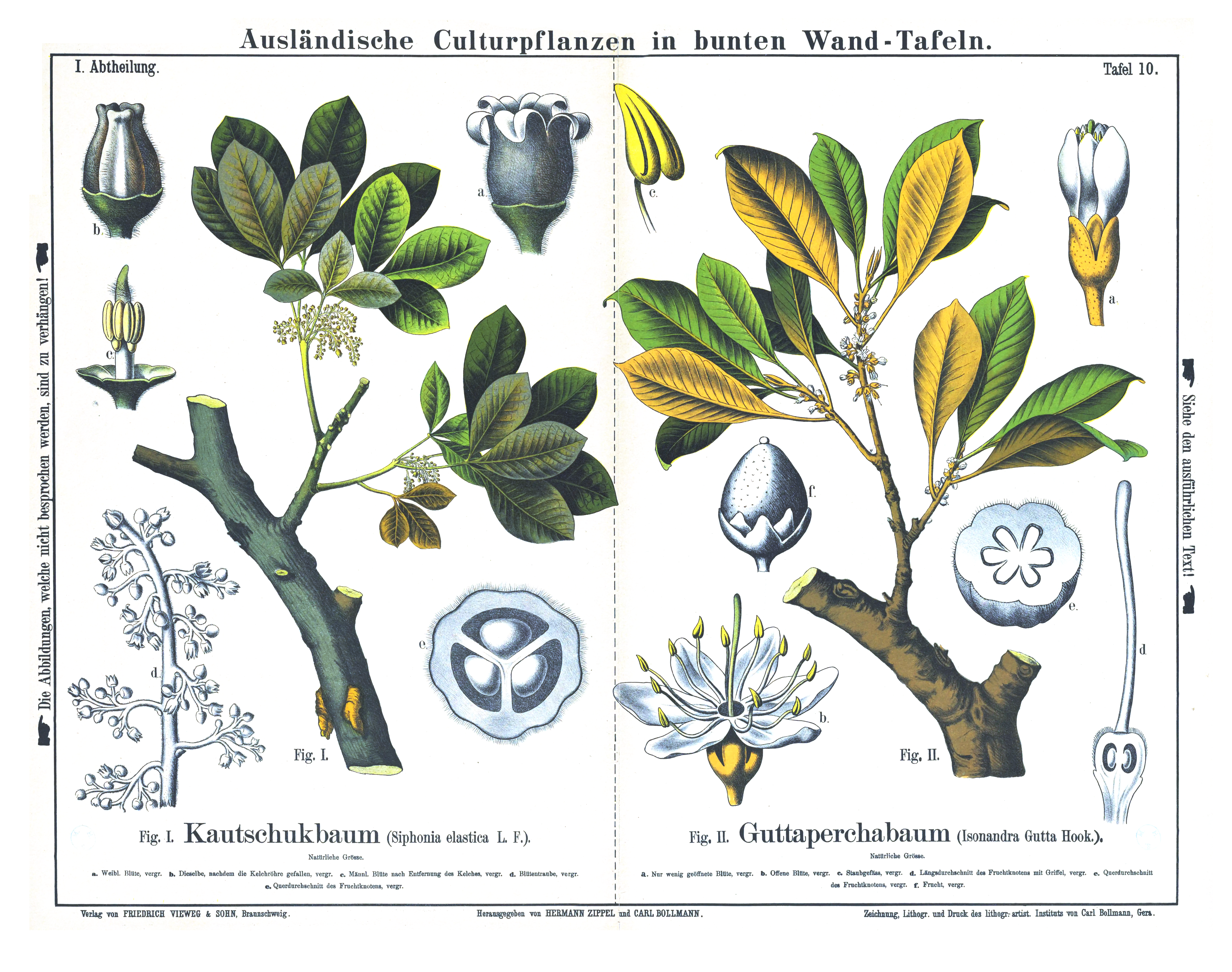

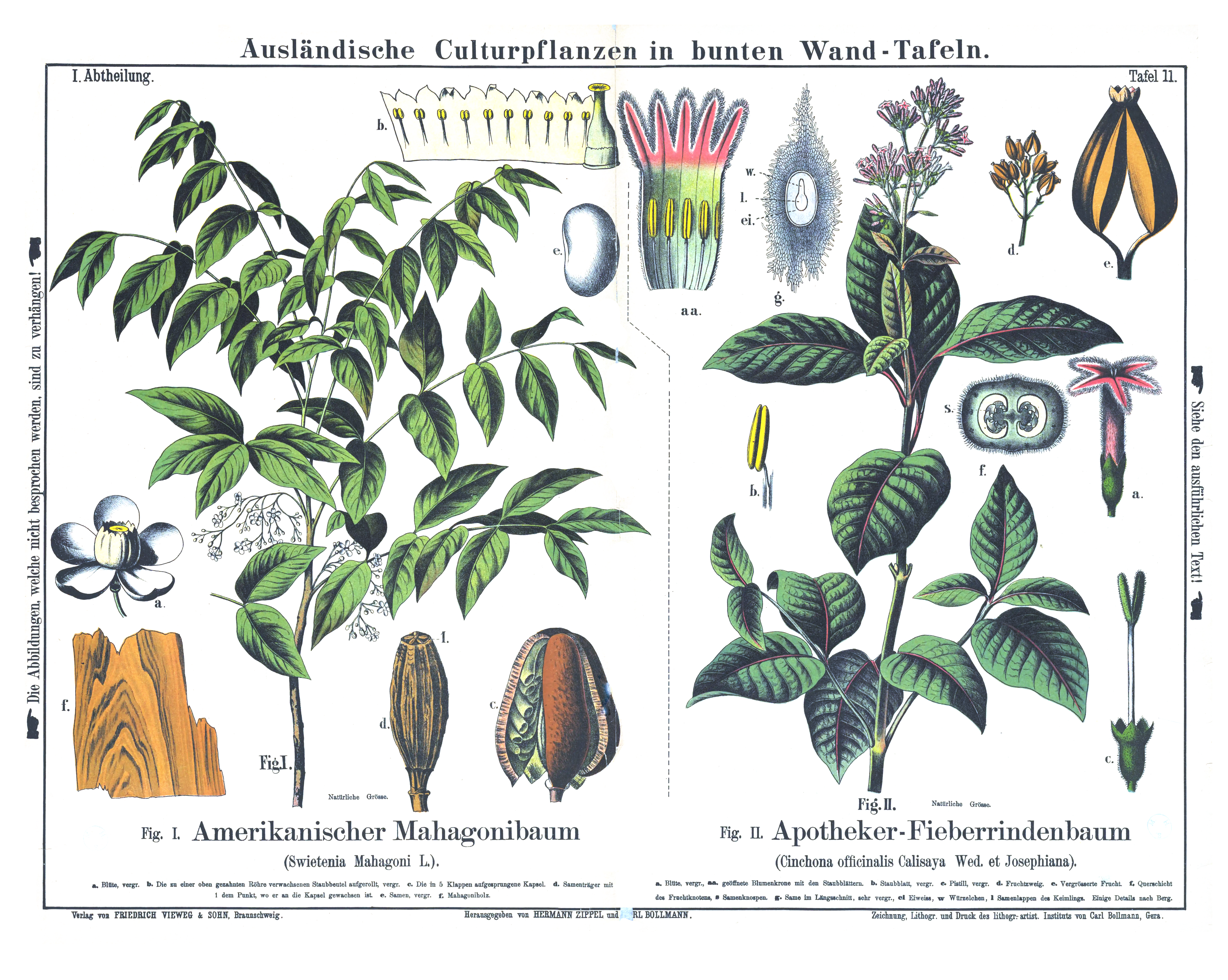

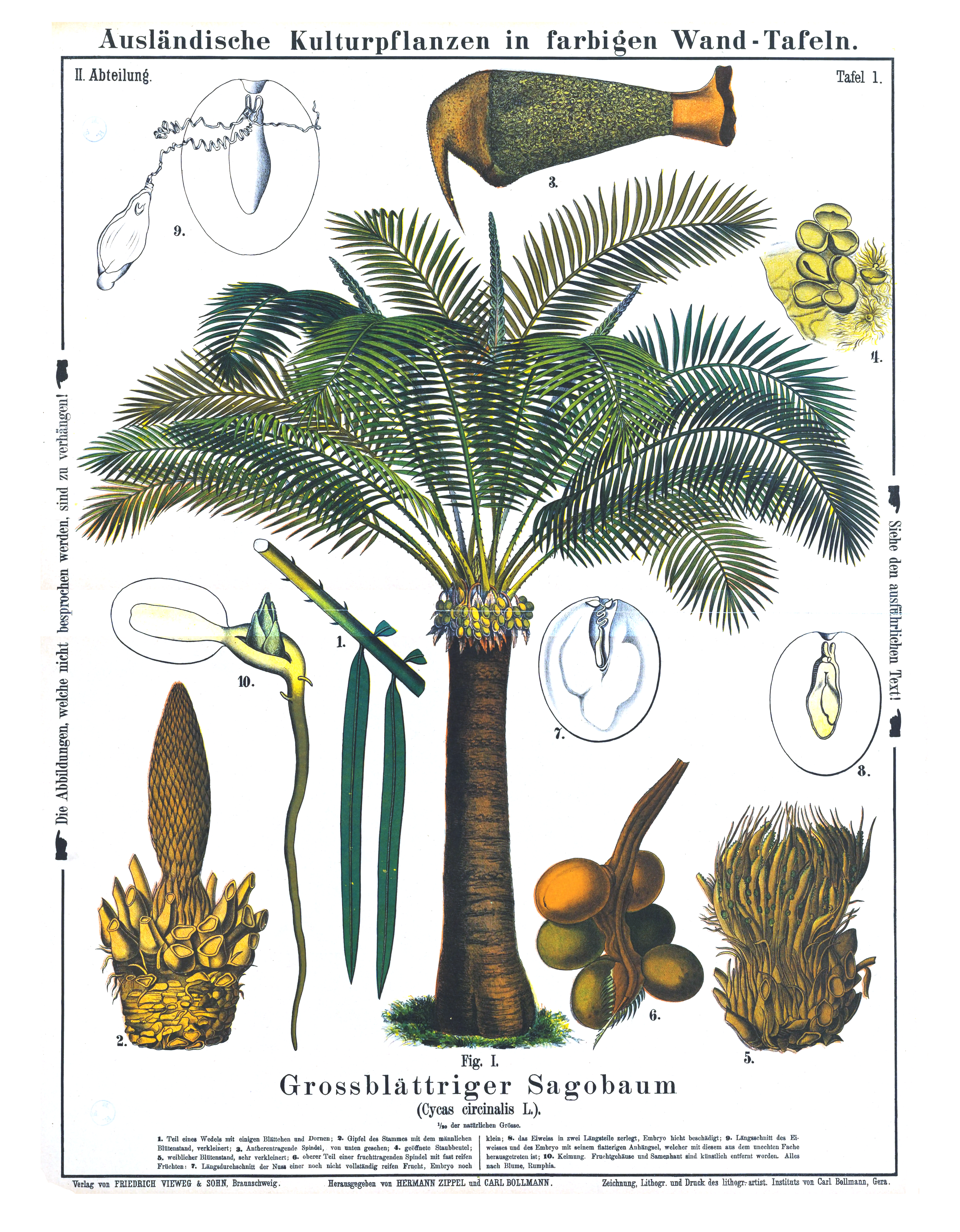

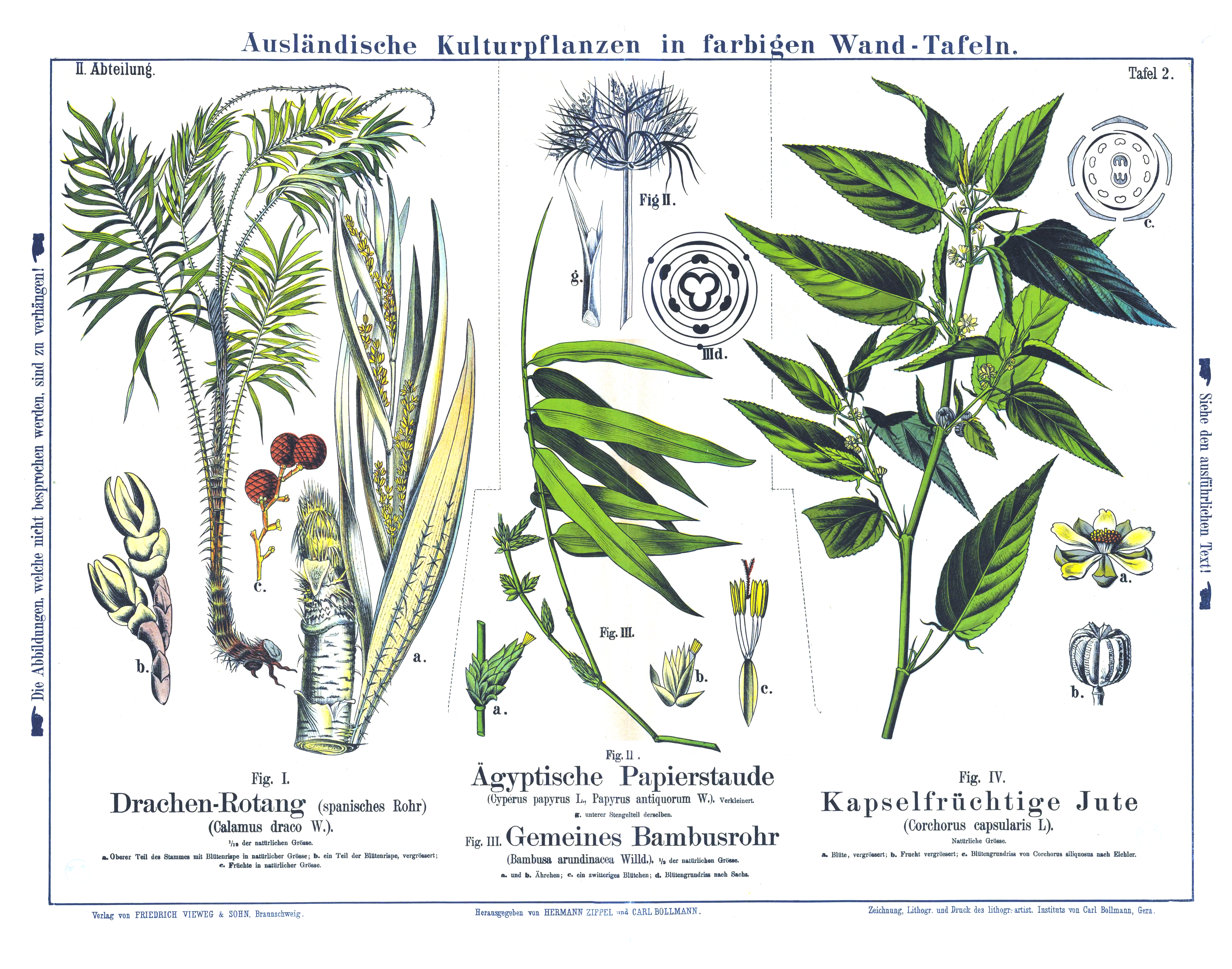

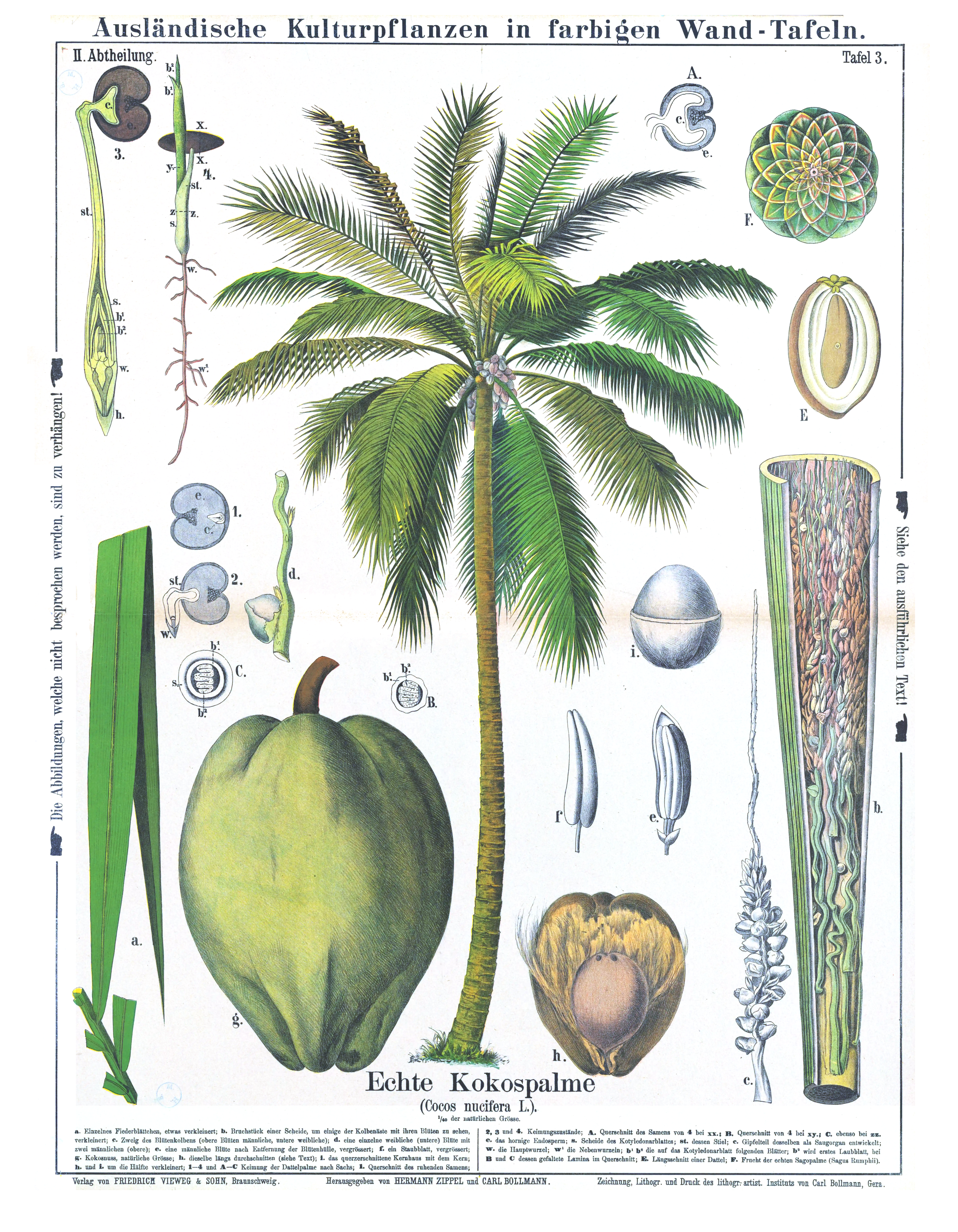

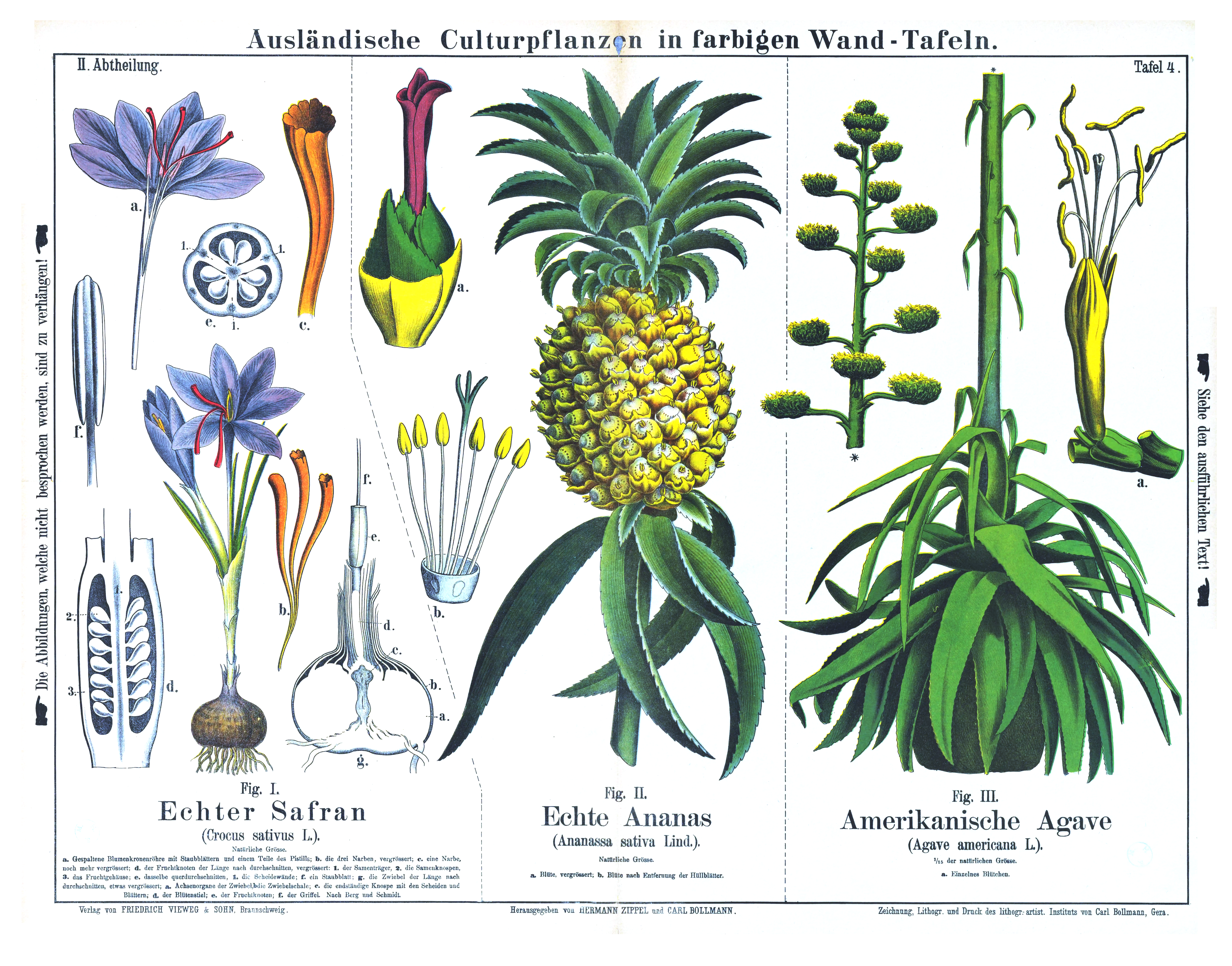

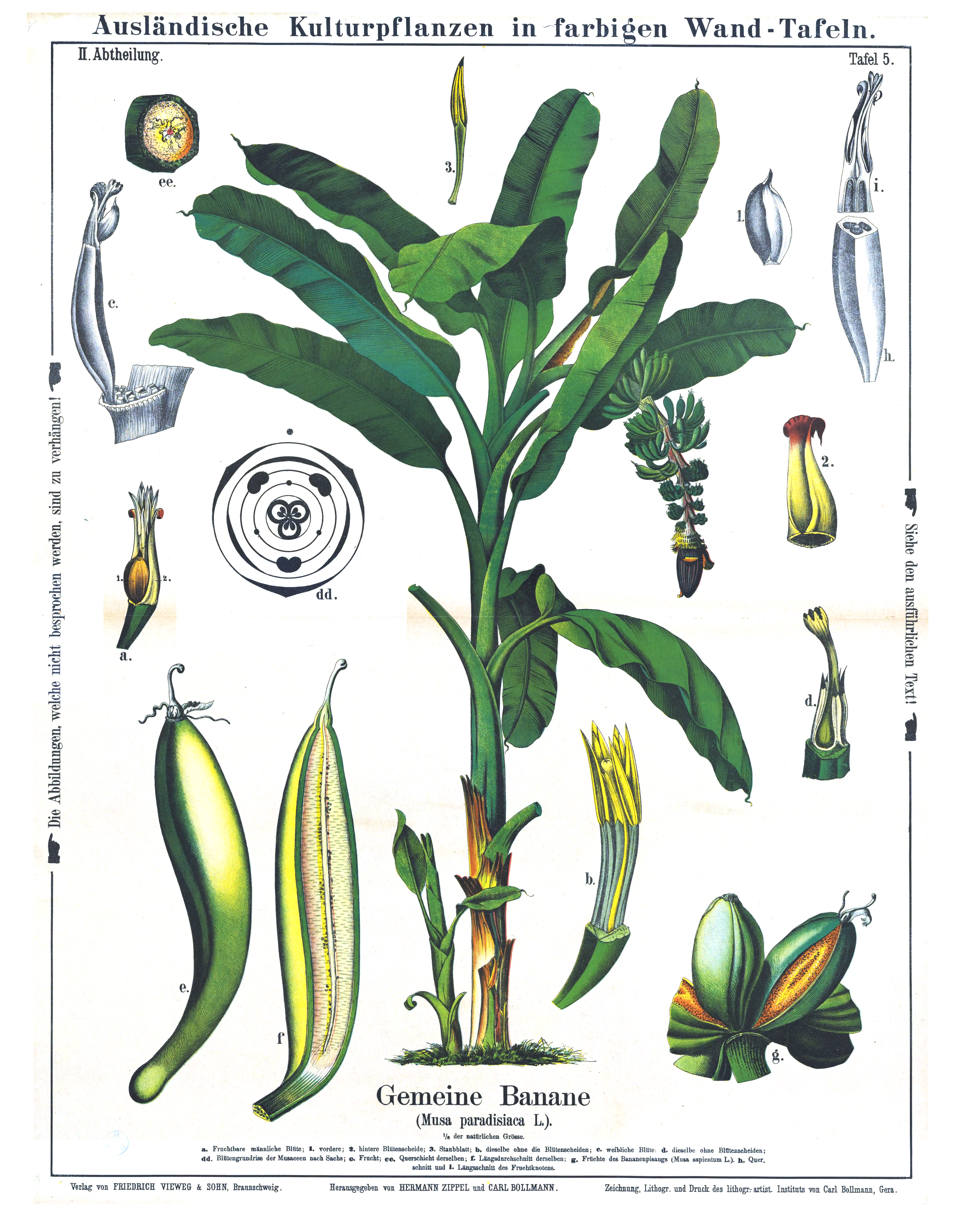

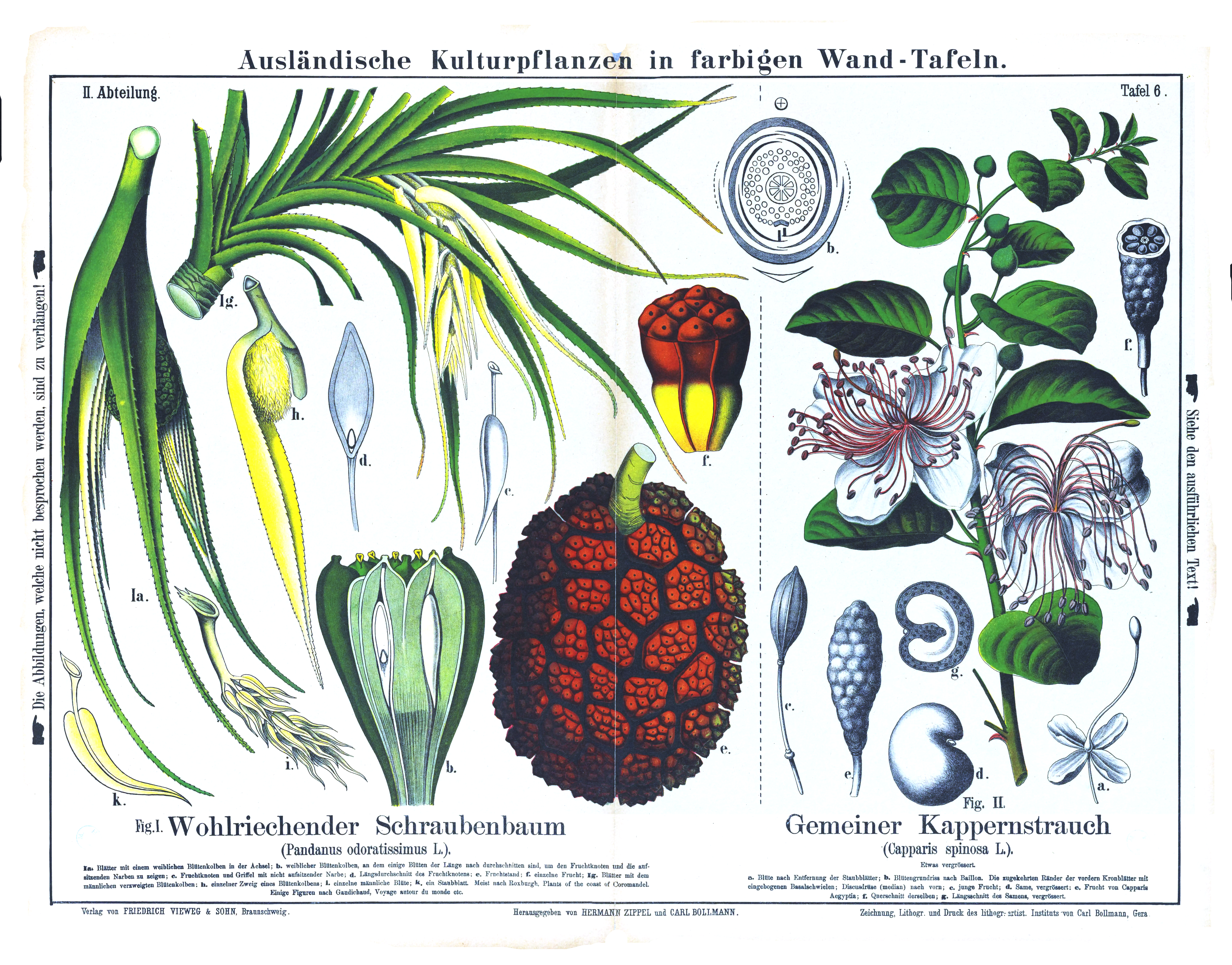

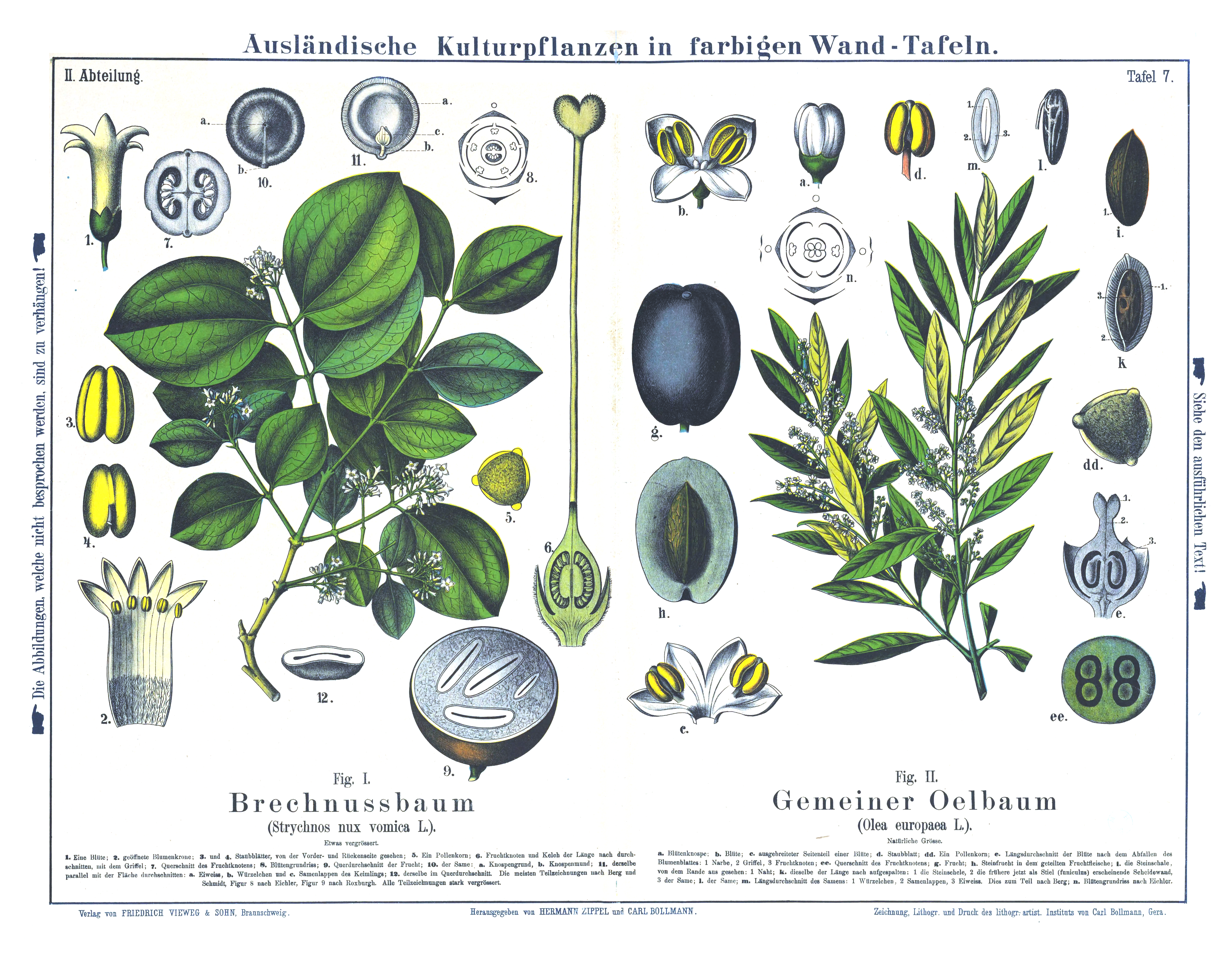

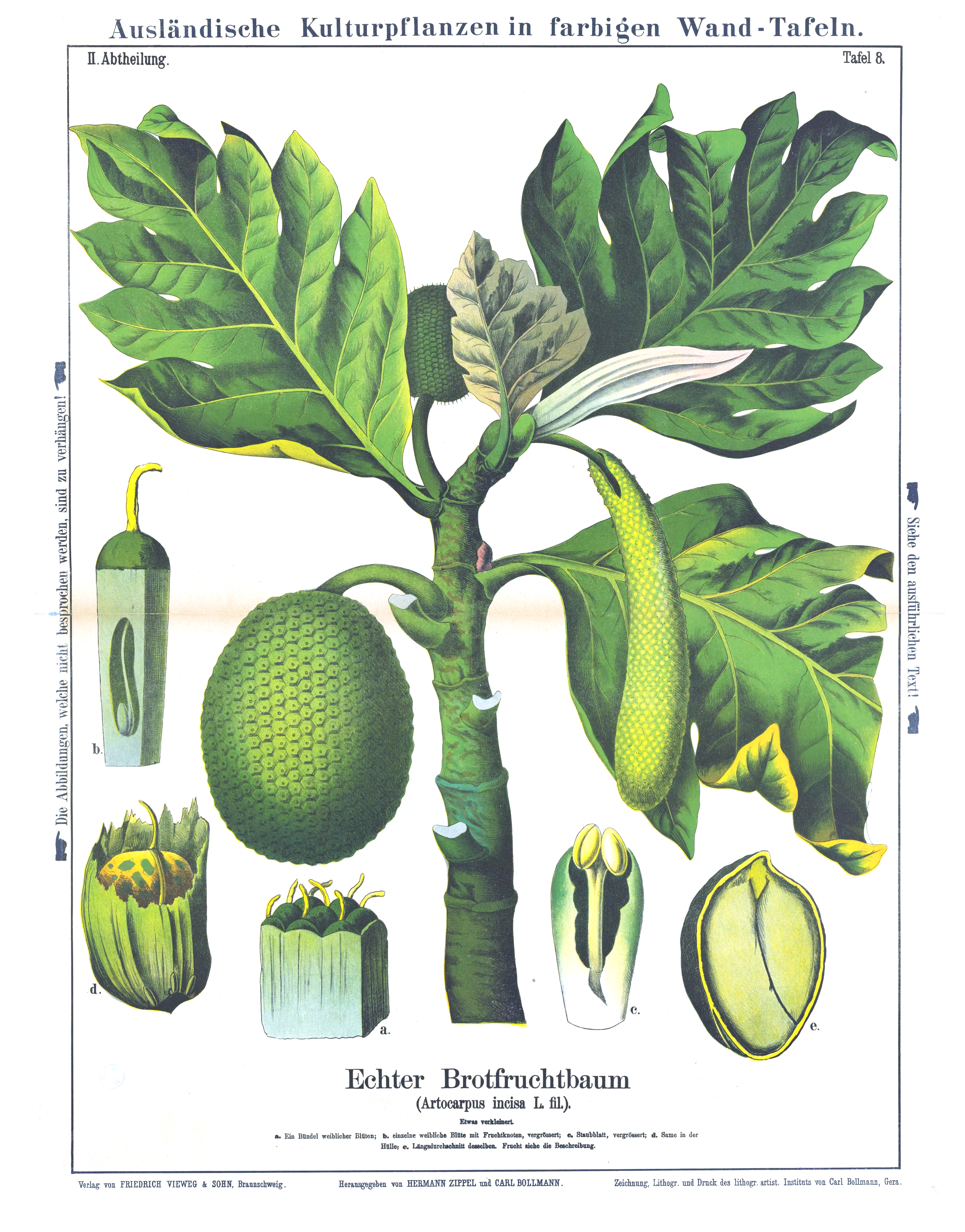

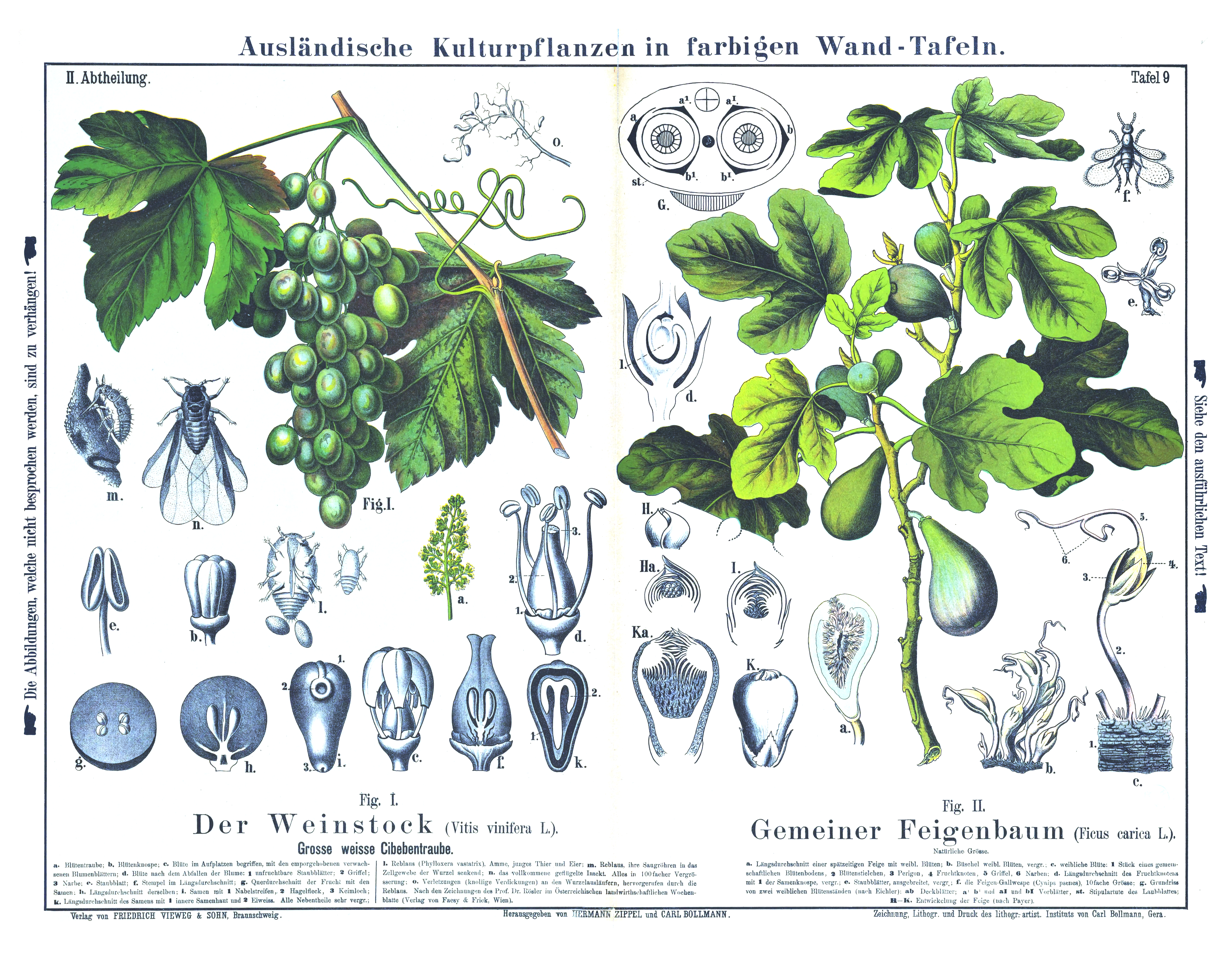

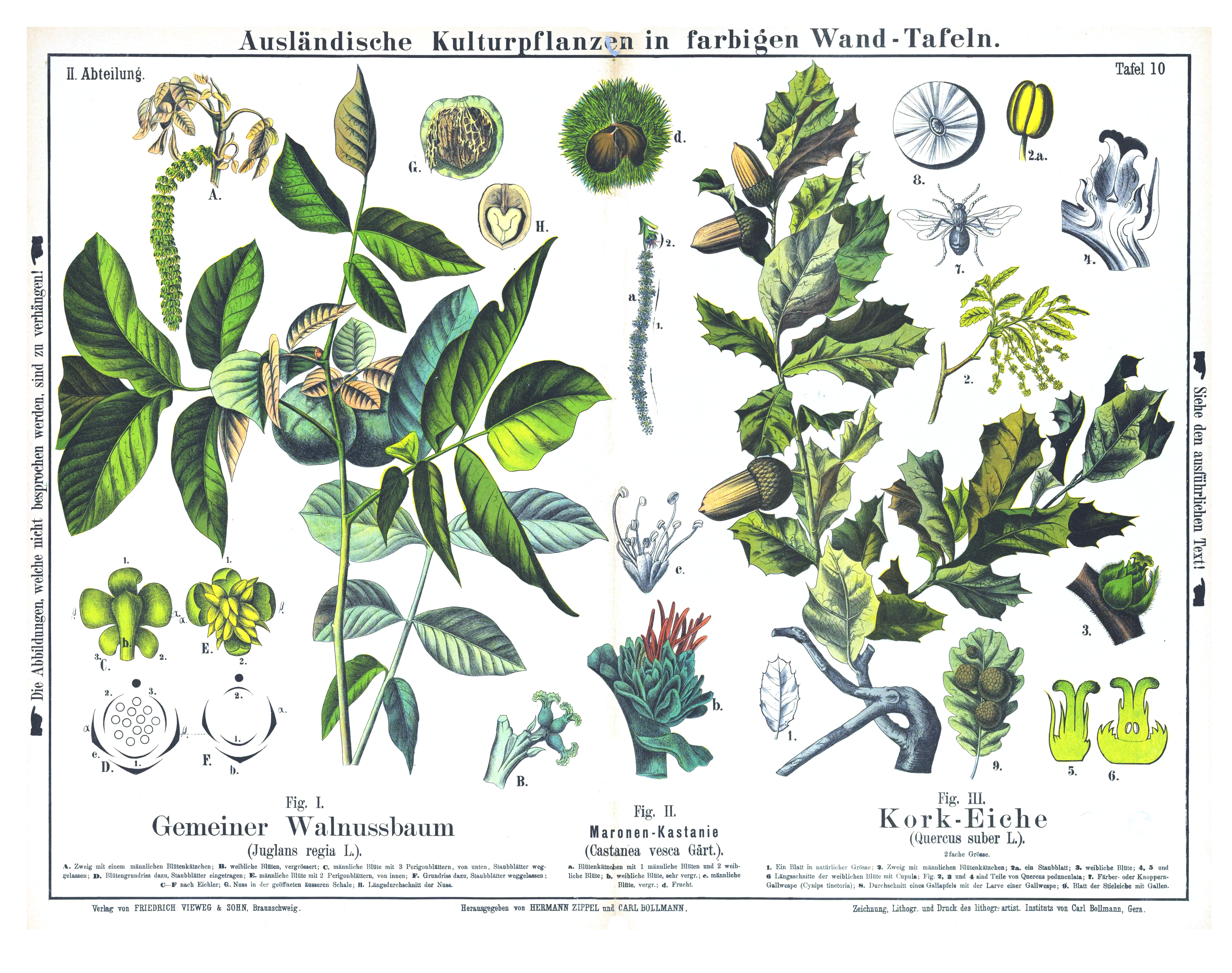

== See also ==
- Paul Pfurtscheller
