= Queen Sirikit Botanic Garden =

Botanical garden in Thailand

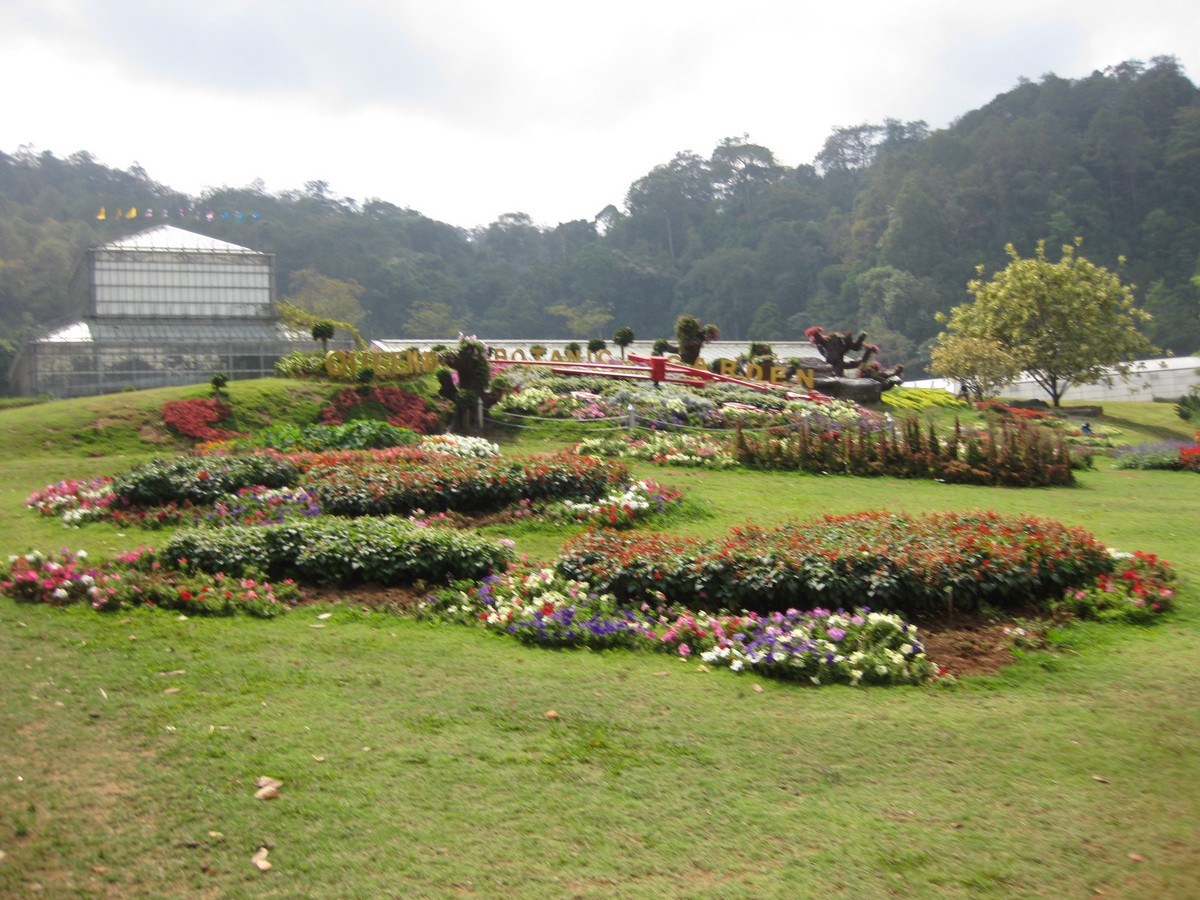
Queen Sirikit Botanic Garden

Queen Sirikit Botanic Garden (QSBG) is a botanical garden in Mae Rim District, Chiang Mai Province, Thailand. It was opened in 1993 and is maintained under the auspices of the Botanical Garden Organization (BGO) of the Ministry of Natural Resources and Environment. Originally called the Mae Sa Botanic Garden, it was renamed for Sirikit, Queen of Thailand, in 1994.

1996 The government increased budget from 22 millions bath to 253 millions bath and 225 millions bath in 1997 and 1998 results in it became the best garden in Thailand and held Royal Flora Ratchaphruek 2006

The 1,000 hectares (2,500 acres) site is home to twelve greenhouses, placing the establishment among Thailand's largest glasshouse complexes. QSBG spreads over a vast area, from a hilly region near to the river Mae Sai (at an elevation of approx. 500 m (1,600 ft)) to the site's highest point, at 1,200 m (4,000 ft). Evergreen and dipterocarp trees occupy lower elevations, while pine forest is found in higher areas. QSBG displays plants and flowers year round. It was Thailand's first botanical garden built according to international standards. It focuses on strengthening ex situ conservation of valuable Thai flora. The breeding programs for native Thai orchids are some of QSBG's most prominent efforts.

== Affiliate gardens ==
In addition to QSBG, the BGO manages four other botanical gardens in Thailand: Romklao Botanical Garden (Phitsanulok Province), Rayong Botanic Garden (Rayong Province), Khon Kaen Botanical Garden (Khon Kaen Province) and Phra Mae Ya Botanic Garden (Sukhothai Province).
