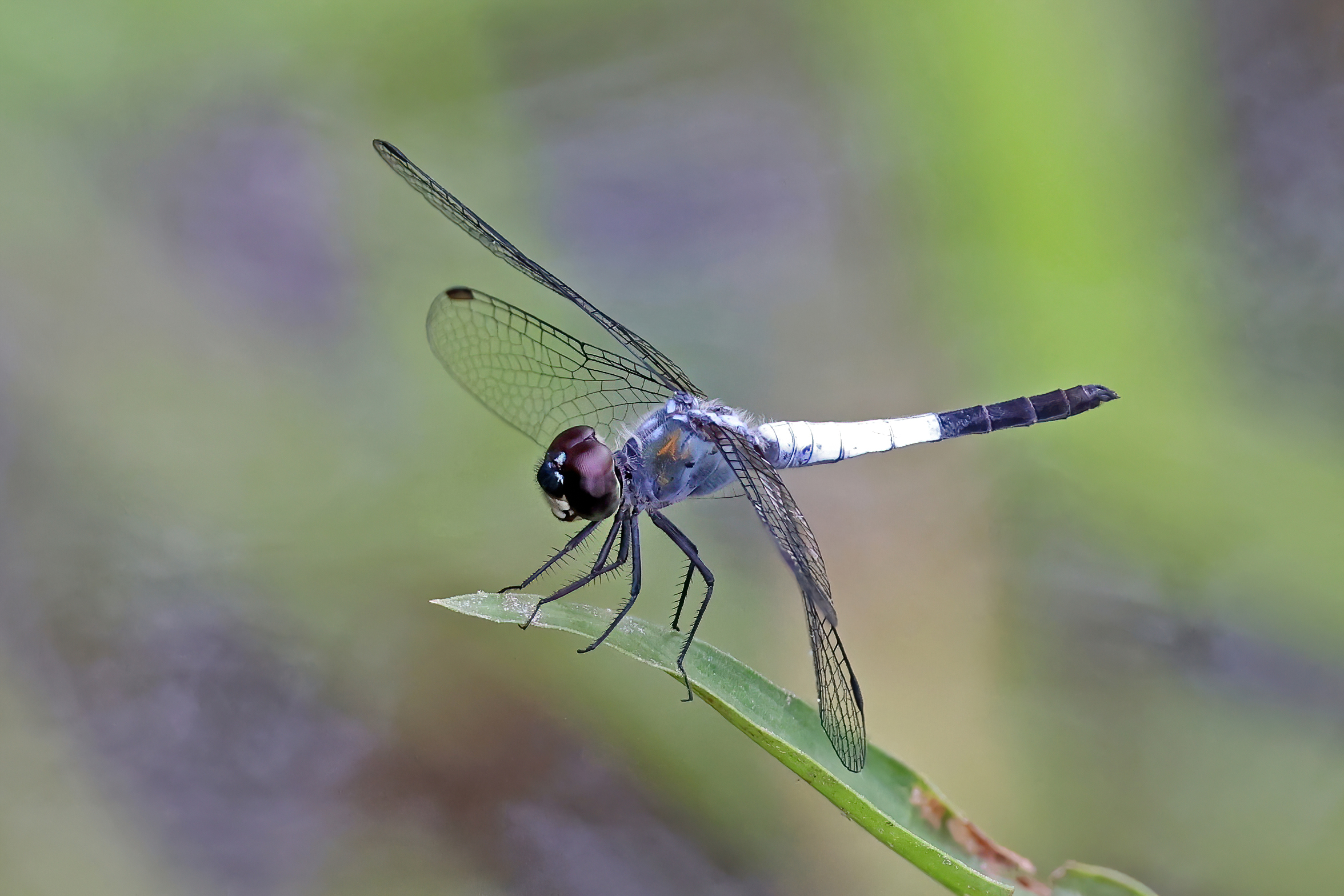
- Young adult male
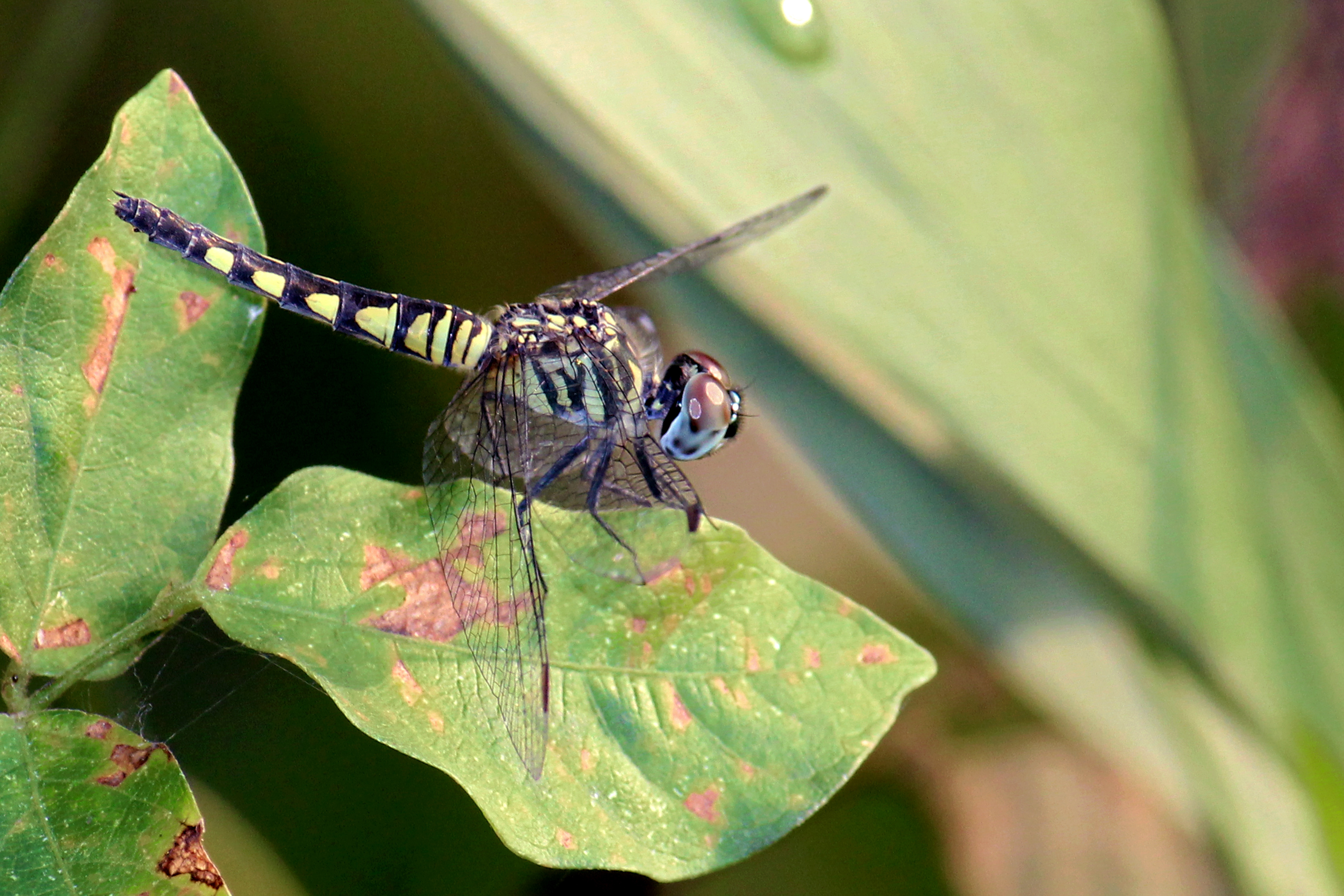
- Female

Conservation status
- Least Concern (IUCN 3.1)

Scientific classification
- Kingdom: Animalia
- Phylum: Arthropoda
- Class: Insecta
- Order: Odonata
- Infraorder: Anisoptera
- Family: Libellulidae
- Genus: Brachydiplax
- Species: B. sobrina

Binomial name
- Brachydiplax sobrina (Rambur, 1842)

Synonyms
- Brachydiplax gestroi Selys, 1891; Brachydiplax indica Kirby, 1889

= Brachydiplax sobrina =

Species of dragonfly

Brachydiplax sobrina is a species of dragonfly in the family Libellulidae. It is native to Bangladesh, India, Myanmar, Nepal, Sri Lanka, and Thailand.

== Description and habitat ==
It is a small dragonfly with dark-brown eyes. Its thorax is yellowish-brown, with black metallic markings. All marks are obscured by bluish-white pruinescence in adults. Abdomen is black on dorsum, marked with broad yellow spots on the sides in sub-adults and tenerals. All the marks are obscured by blue pruinescence in adults. Female is similar to the teneral male.

It breeds in marshes, ditches, and ponds.
