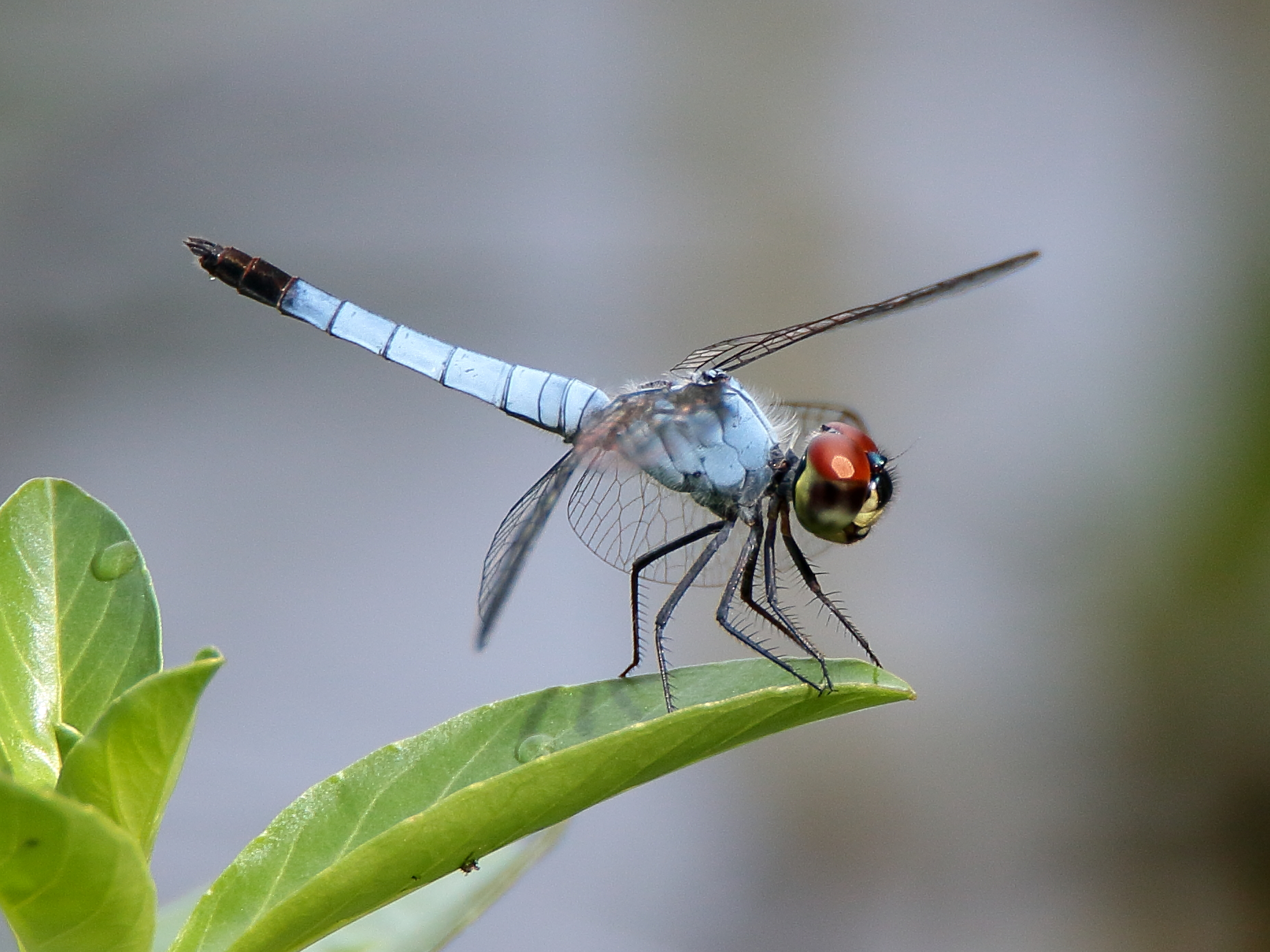
- Male Brachydiplax denticauda
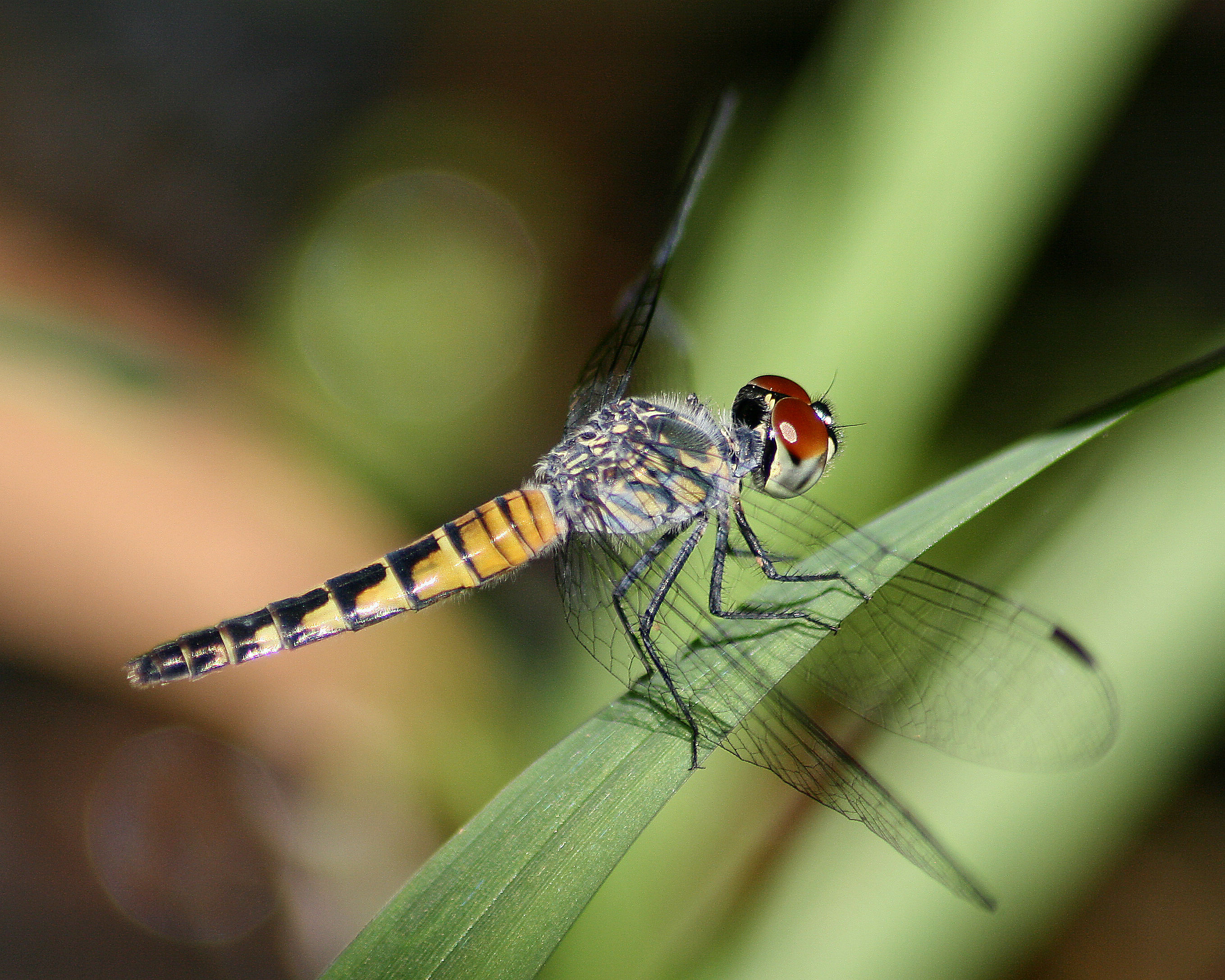
- Female Brachydiplax denticauda

Conservation status
- Least Concern (IUCN 3.1)

Scientific classification
- Kingdom: Animalia
- Phylum: Arthropoda
- Clade: Pancrustacea
- Class: Insecta
- Order: Odonata
- Infraorder: Anisoptera
- Family: Libellulidae
- Genus: Brachydiplax
- Species: B. denticauda

Binomial name
- Brachydiplax denticauda (Brauer, 1867)

Synonyms
- Diplax denticauda Brauer, 1867; Nannodiplax finschi Karsch, 1889; Brachydiplax australis Kirby, 1894

= Brachydiplax denticauda =

Palemouth

Species of dragonfly

Brachydiplax denticauda is a species of dragonfly in the family Libellulidae known commonly as the palemouth. It is native to Australia, Indonesia, Papua New Guinea, and the Solomon Islands. It lives in habitat with still and slow-moving waters.

Males of this species are typical in colour for the genus, being bright powder blue on both the thorax and abdomen. The labrum is pale cream, thus giving the species its common name of palemouth. In northern Australia, it is found coastal and adjacent inland in an arc from the southern Queensland border to Broome, Western Australia.

== Brief Description ==
This species is small in size with a wingspan of 40 to 60 millimeters. Brachydiplax denticauda usually has six antenodal crossveins in the fore-wing and five in the hind-wing whereas the very similar Brachydiplax duivenbodei has seven antenodal crossveins in the fore-wing and six in the hind-wing. Though brightly coloured, the males often go unnoticed by an observer once they land on a lily pad or similar place.

== Etymology ==
The genus name Brachydiplax is derived from the Greek βραχύς (brakhys, "short"), combined with Diplax, a genus name derived from the Greek δίς (dis, "twice") and πλάξ (plax, "flat and broad"). The name refers to the relationship of the genus to Diplax.

The species name denticauda is derived from the Latin dens ("tooth") and cauda ("tail"), referring to the teeth on the appendages of the male.

== Gallery ==
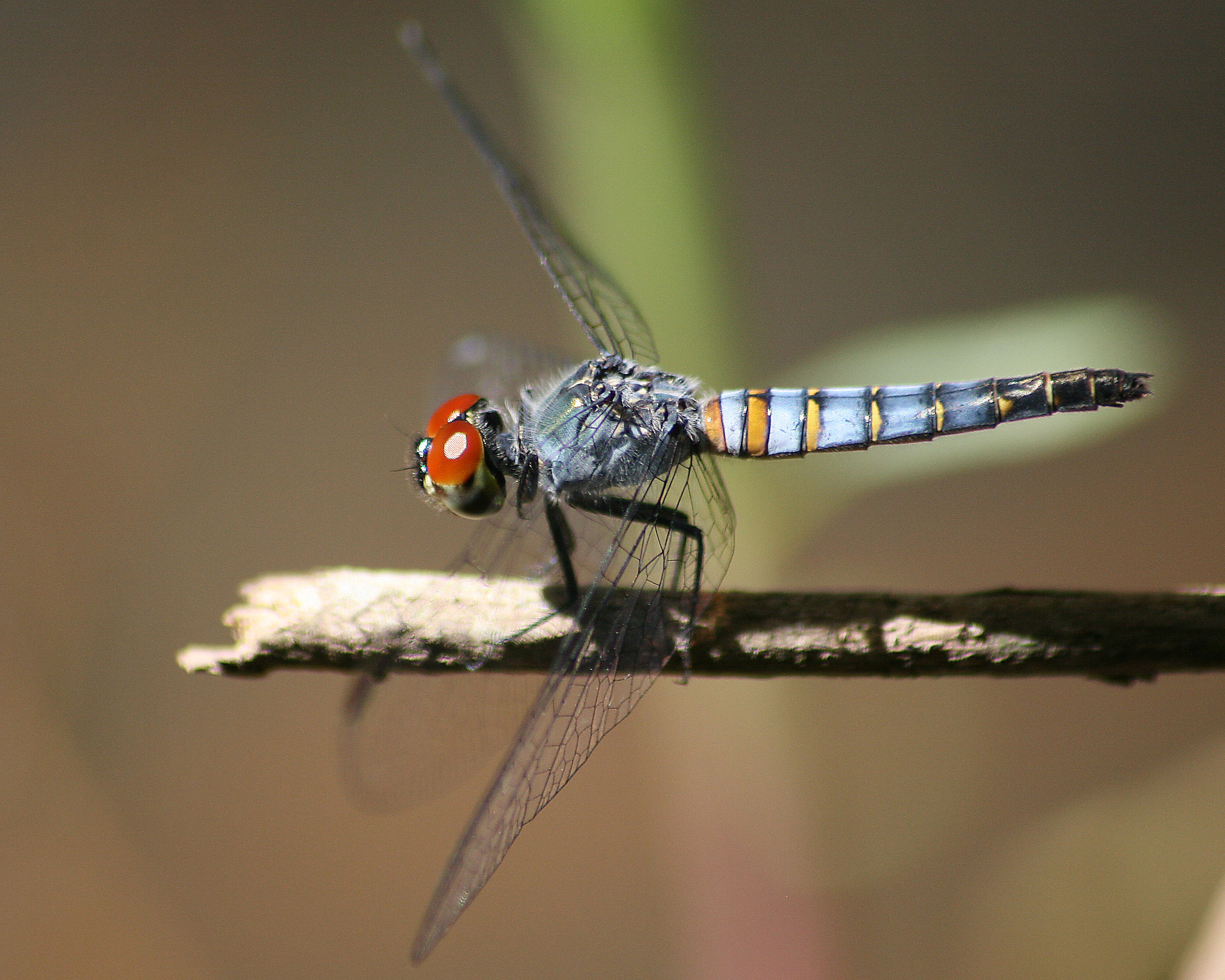
Female

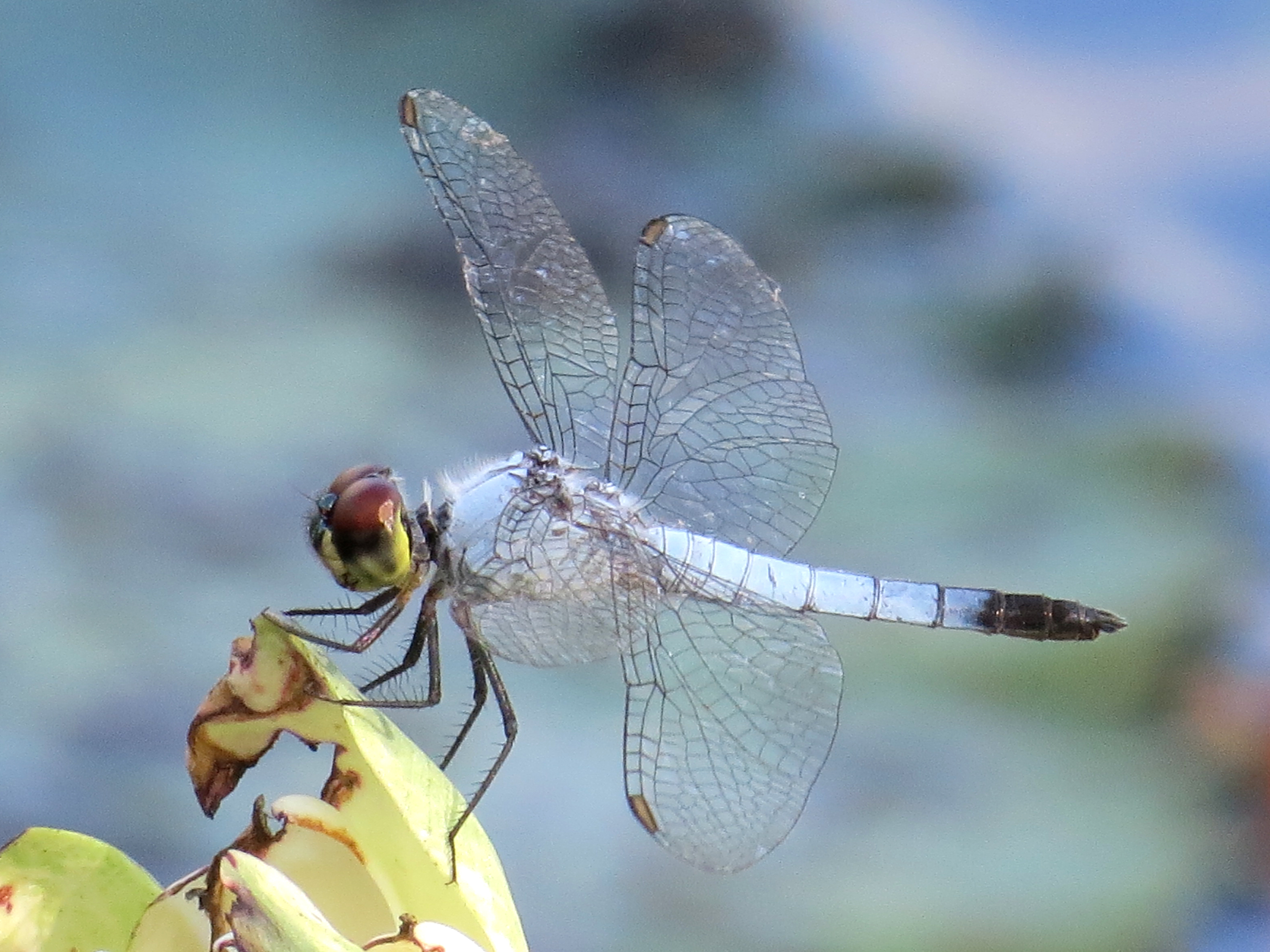
Mature male

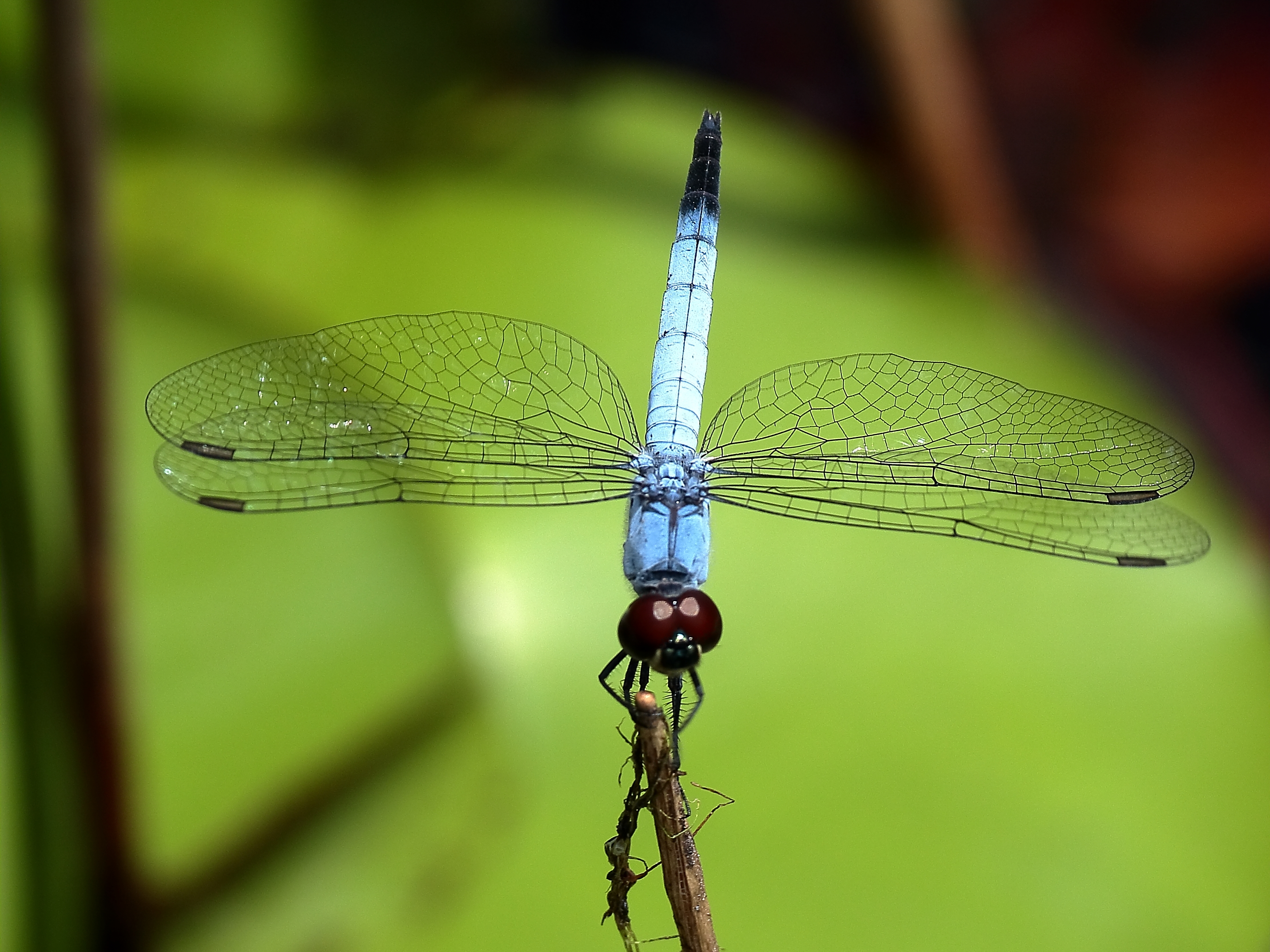
An adult male Palemouth has a pale blue tail with a black tip

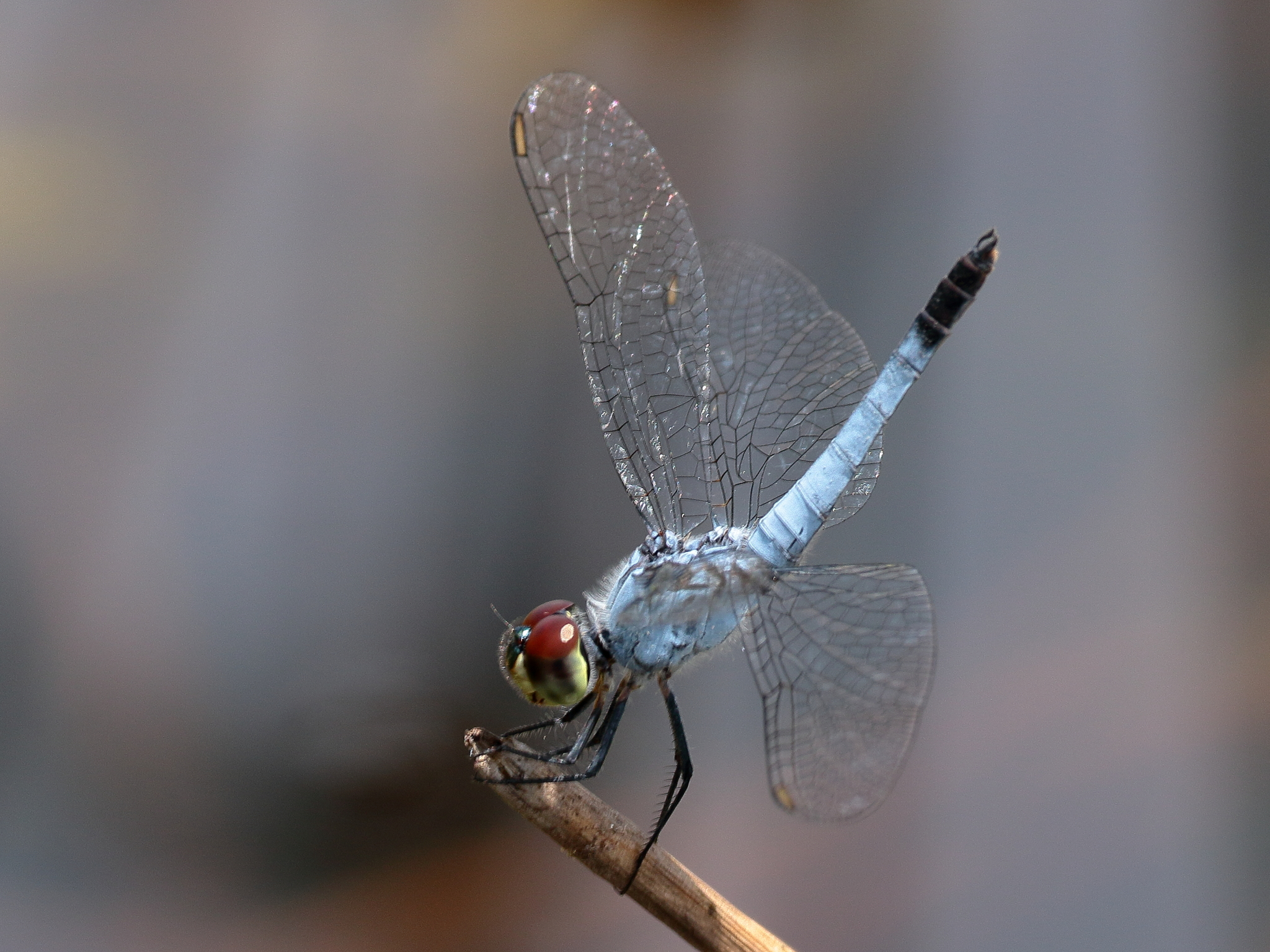
Male puts his tail in the air in an obelisk position that is not vertical

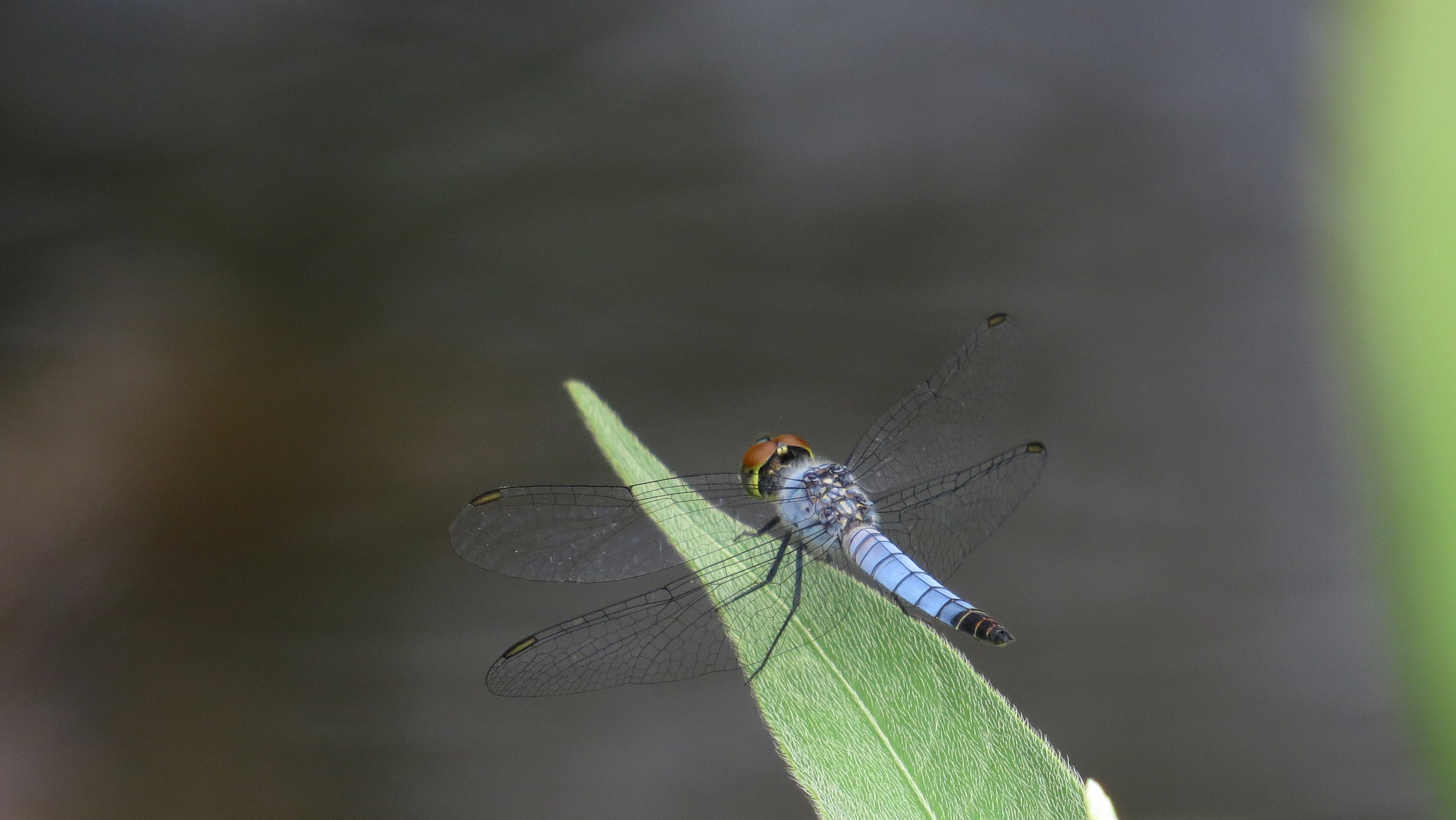
Male from behind showing a creamy yellow mark on the outside of his eye rim

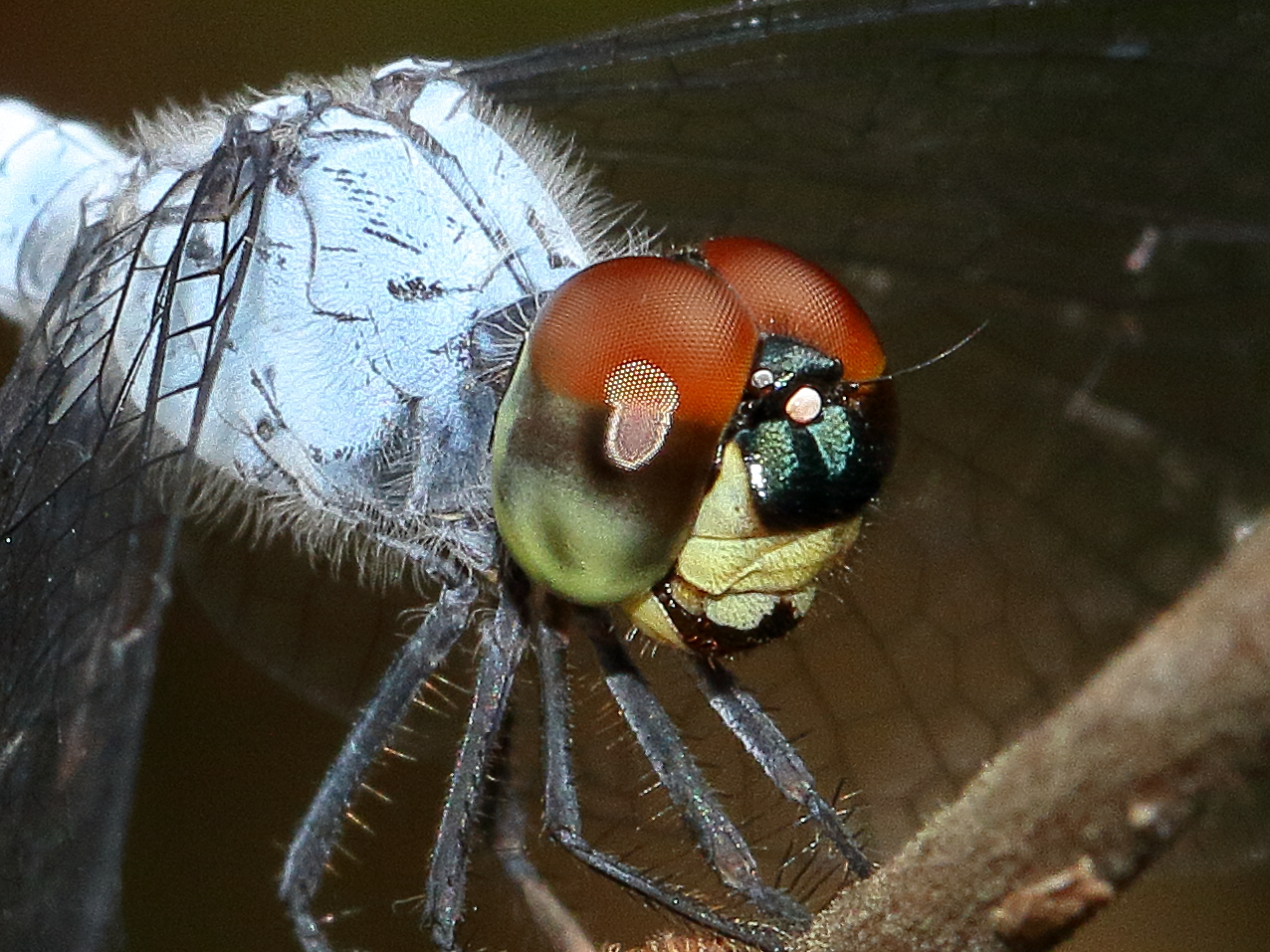
Close-up of head highlighting the pale mouth

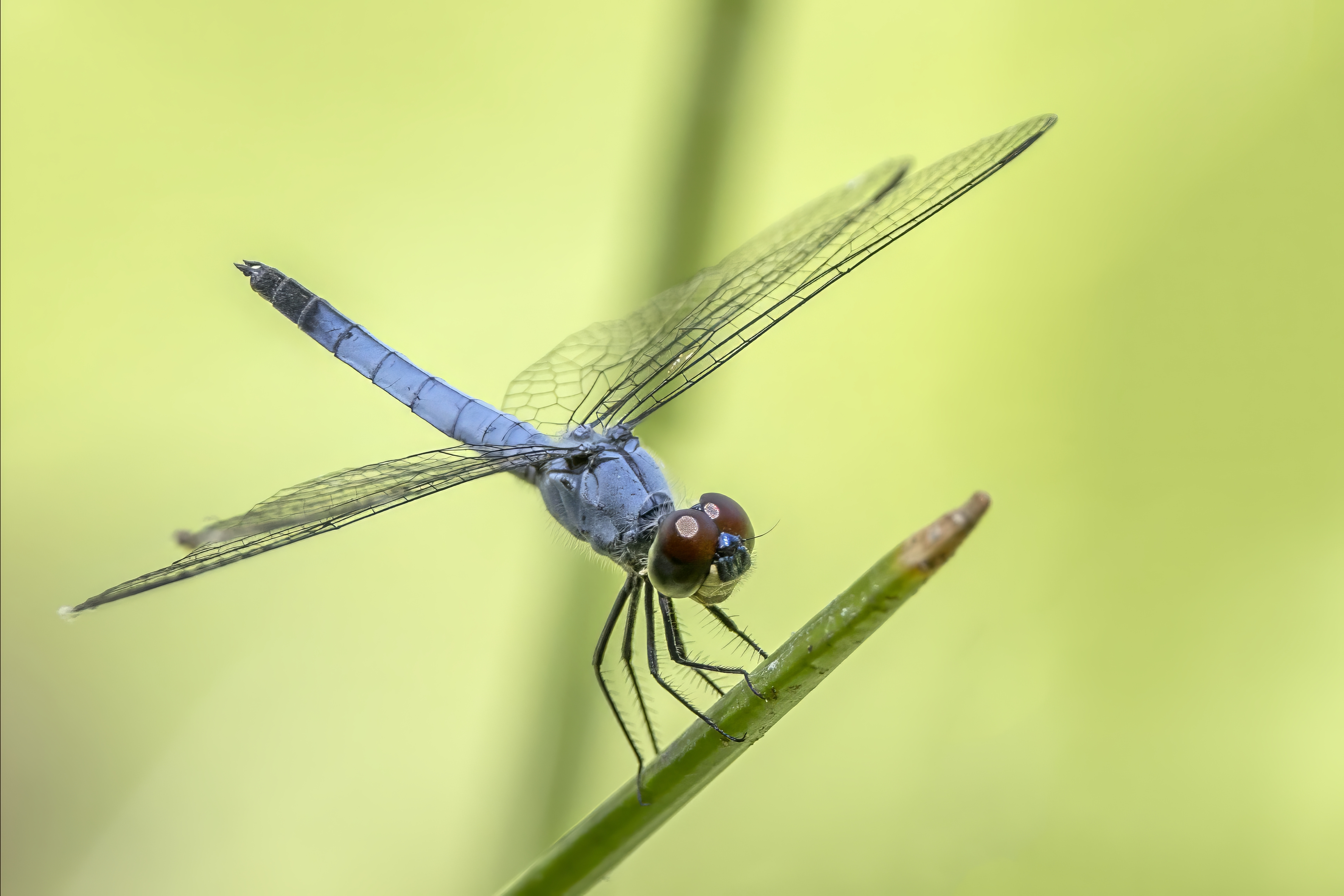
Male

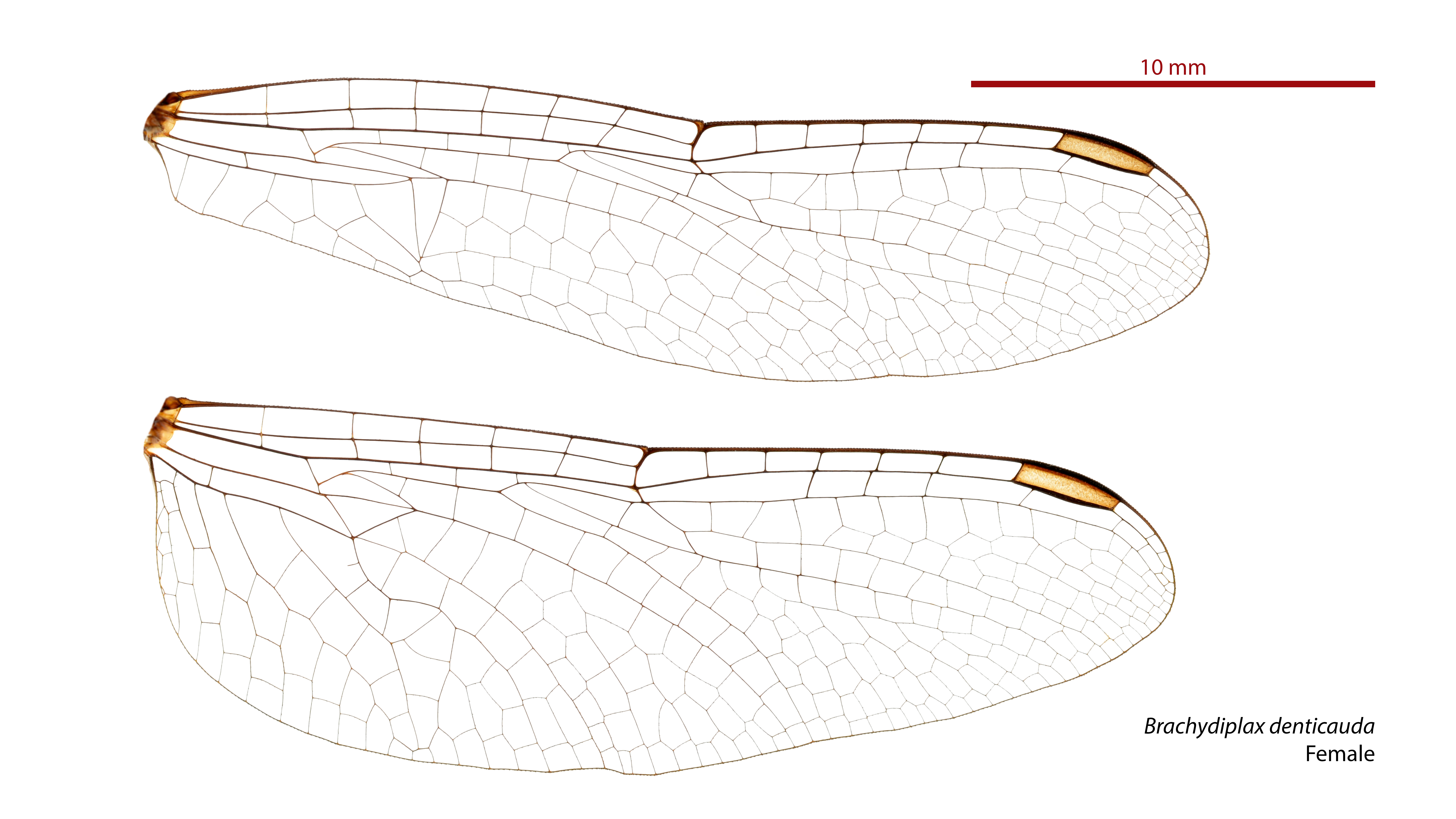
Female wings

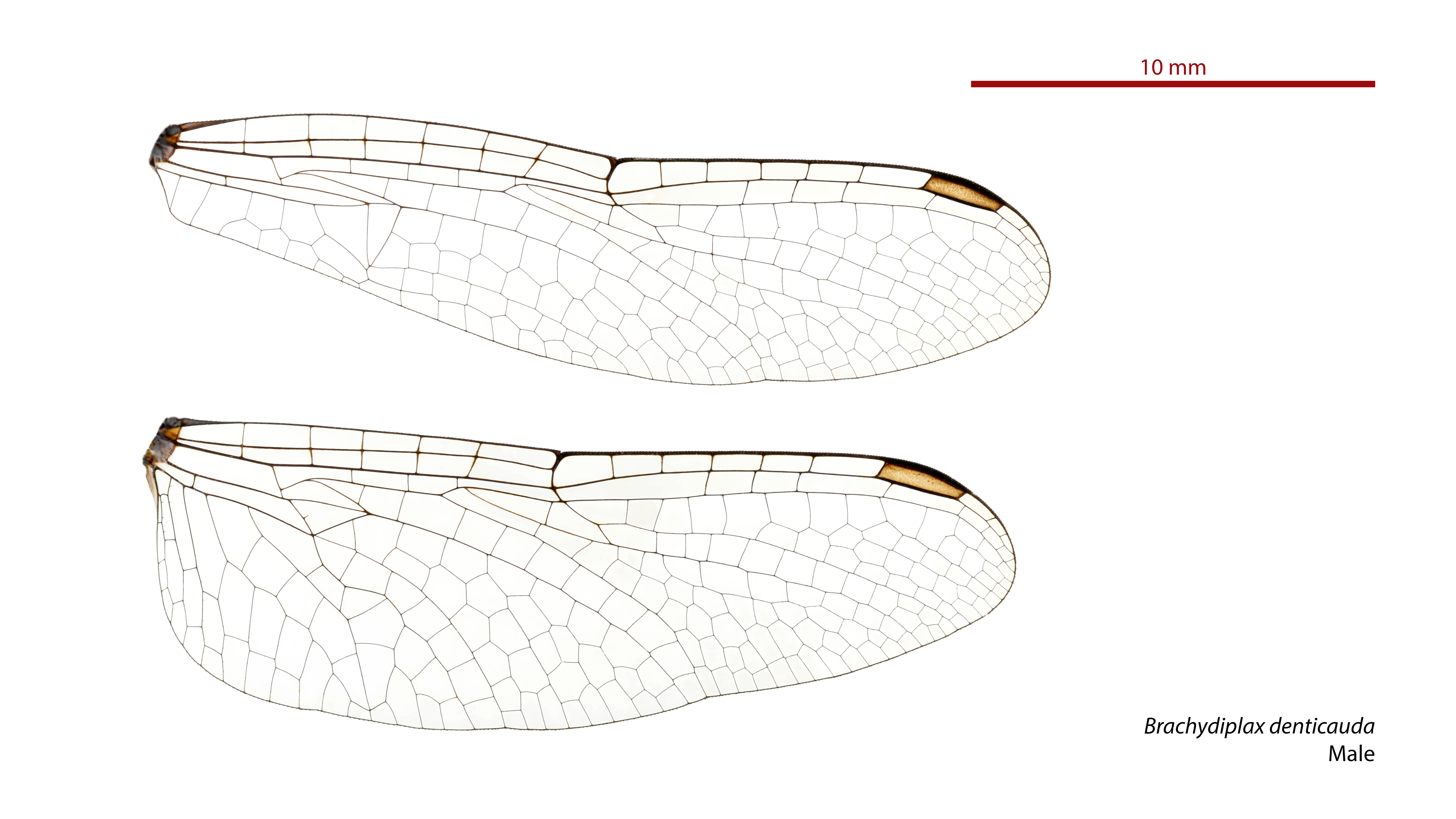
Male wings
