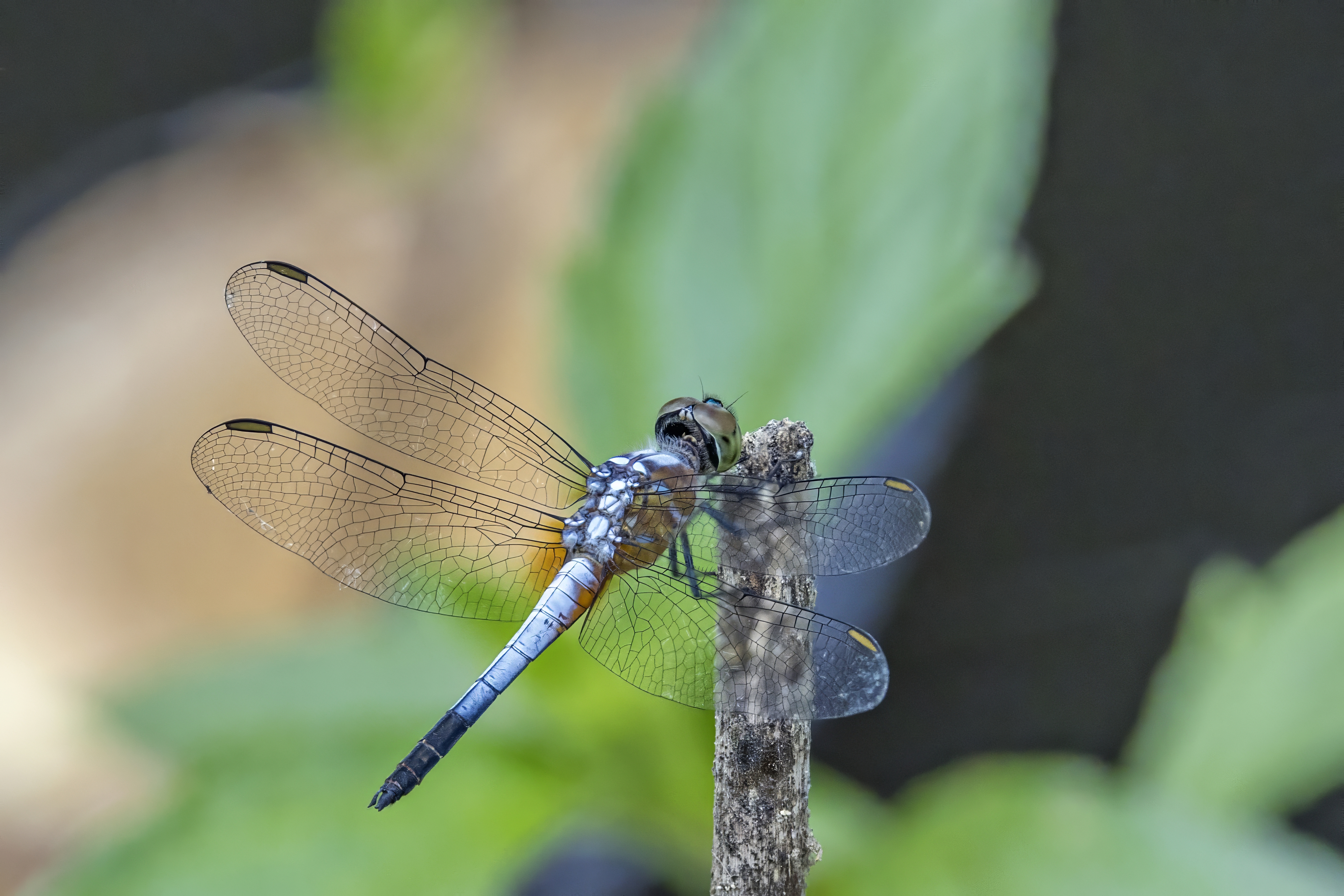
- Male
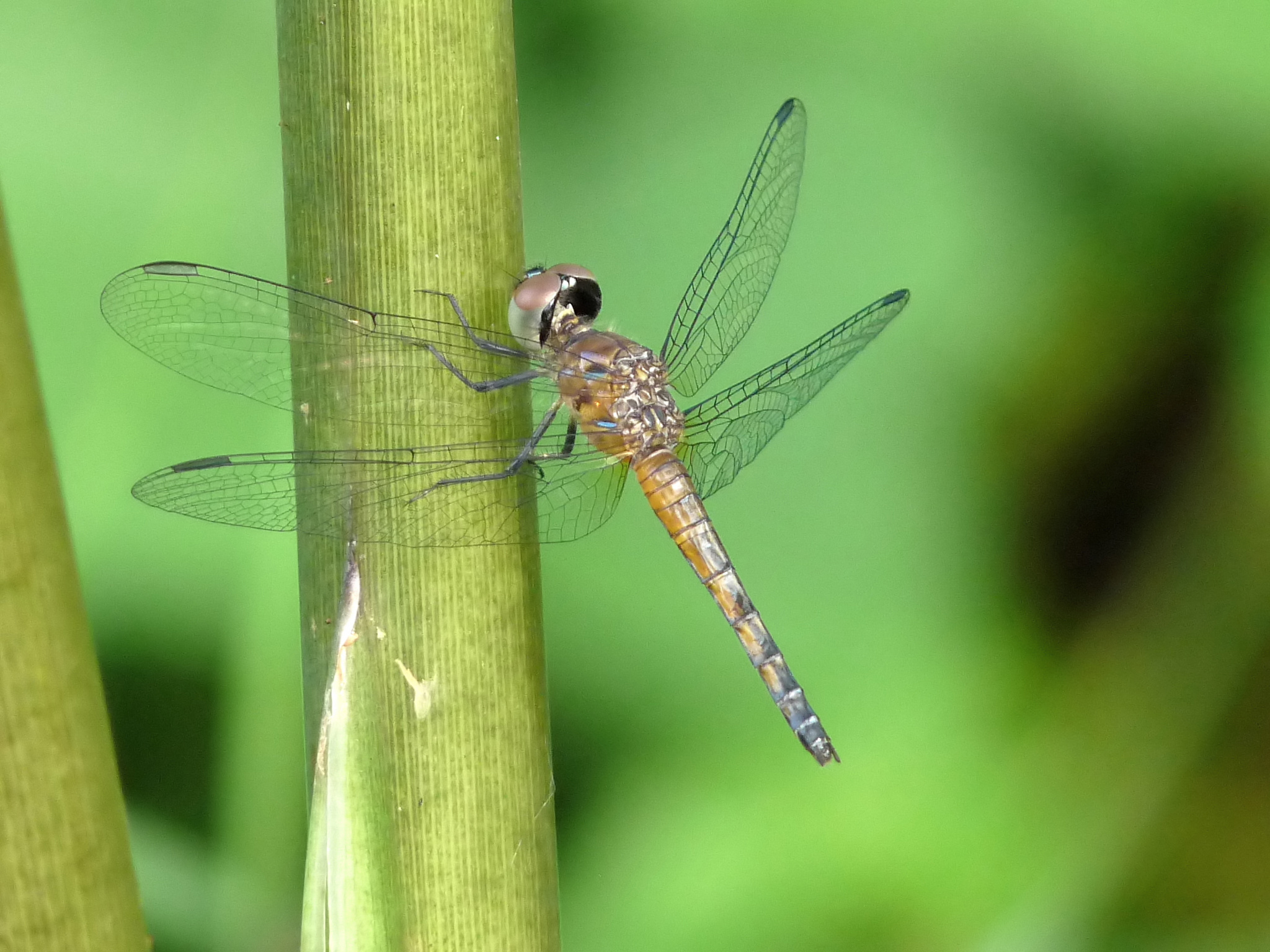
- Female

Conservation status
- Least Concern (IUCN 3.1)

Scientific classification
- Kingdom: Animalia
- Phylum: Arthropoda
- Clade: Pancrustacea
- Class: Insecta
- Order: Odonata
- Infraorder: Anisoptera
- Family: Libellulidae
- Genus: Brachydiplax
- Species: B. chalybea

Binomial name
- Brachydiplax chalybea (Brauer, 1868)

Synonyms
- Brachydiplax maria Selys, 1878; Planiplax okinavensis Oguma, 1922

= Brachydiplax chalybea =

Species of dragonfly

Brachydiplax chalybea is a species of dragonfly in the family Libellulidae. It is known by the common names yellow-patched lieutenant, rufous-backed marsh hawk, and blue dasher. It is native to much of eastern Asia, from India to Japan to Indonesia.

== Description and habitat ==
The male of the species is 33 to 35 millimeters long and has a hindwing 24 to 27 millimeters long. It is powder blue with light brown sides and a dark tip to the abdomen. Wings are hyaline, with tinted burnt-brown base, fading to amber. The female is brownish yellow in color with darker markings along the dorsal abdomen. Its wings lack the yellow tinge. This species can be easily distinguished from other species in this genus by its larger size, characteristic colour of the thorax, and bases of wings.

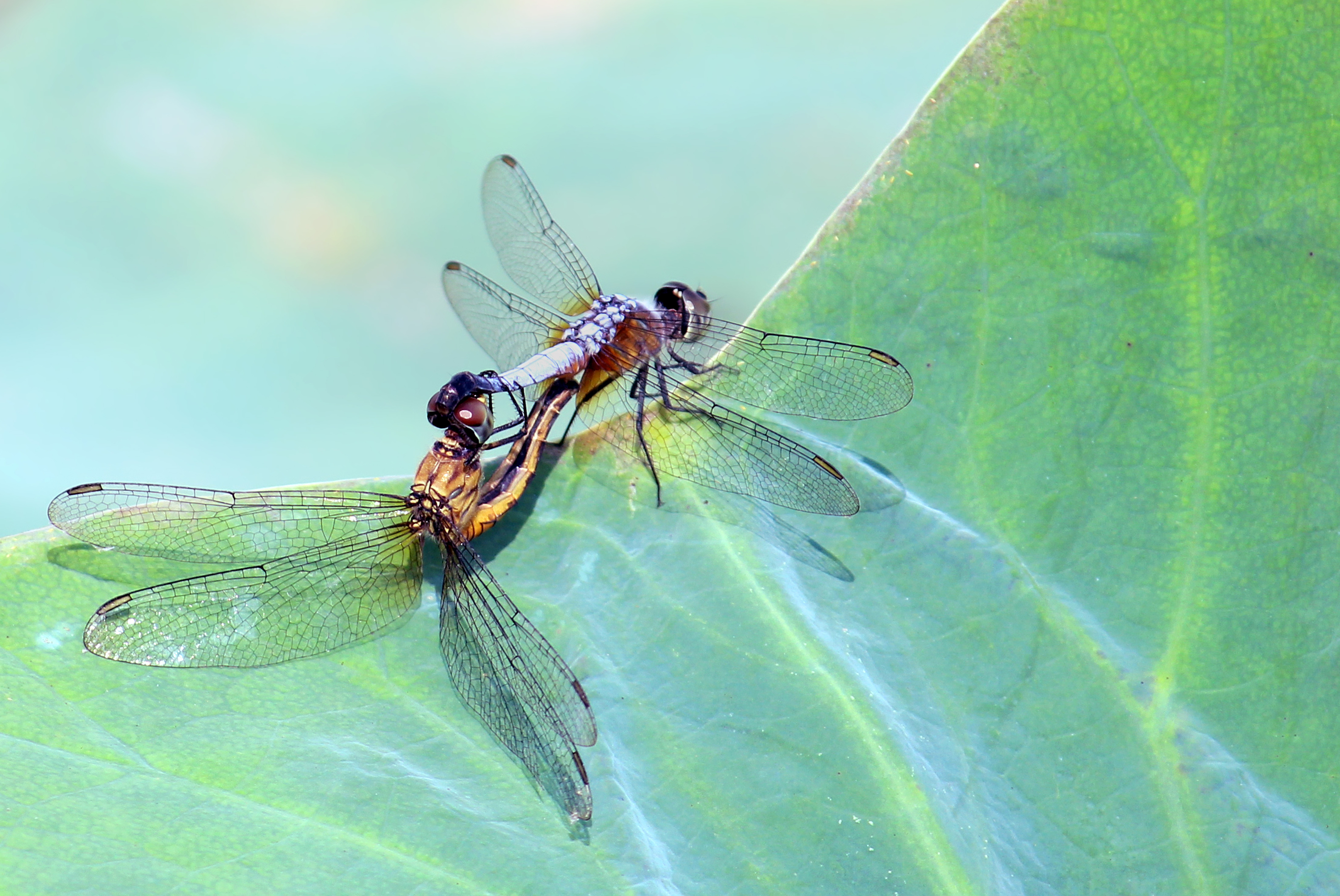
Mating

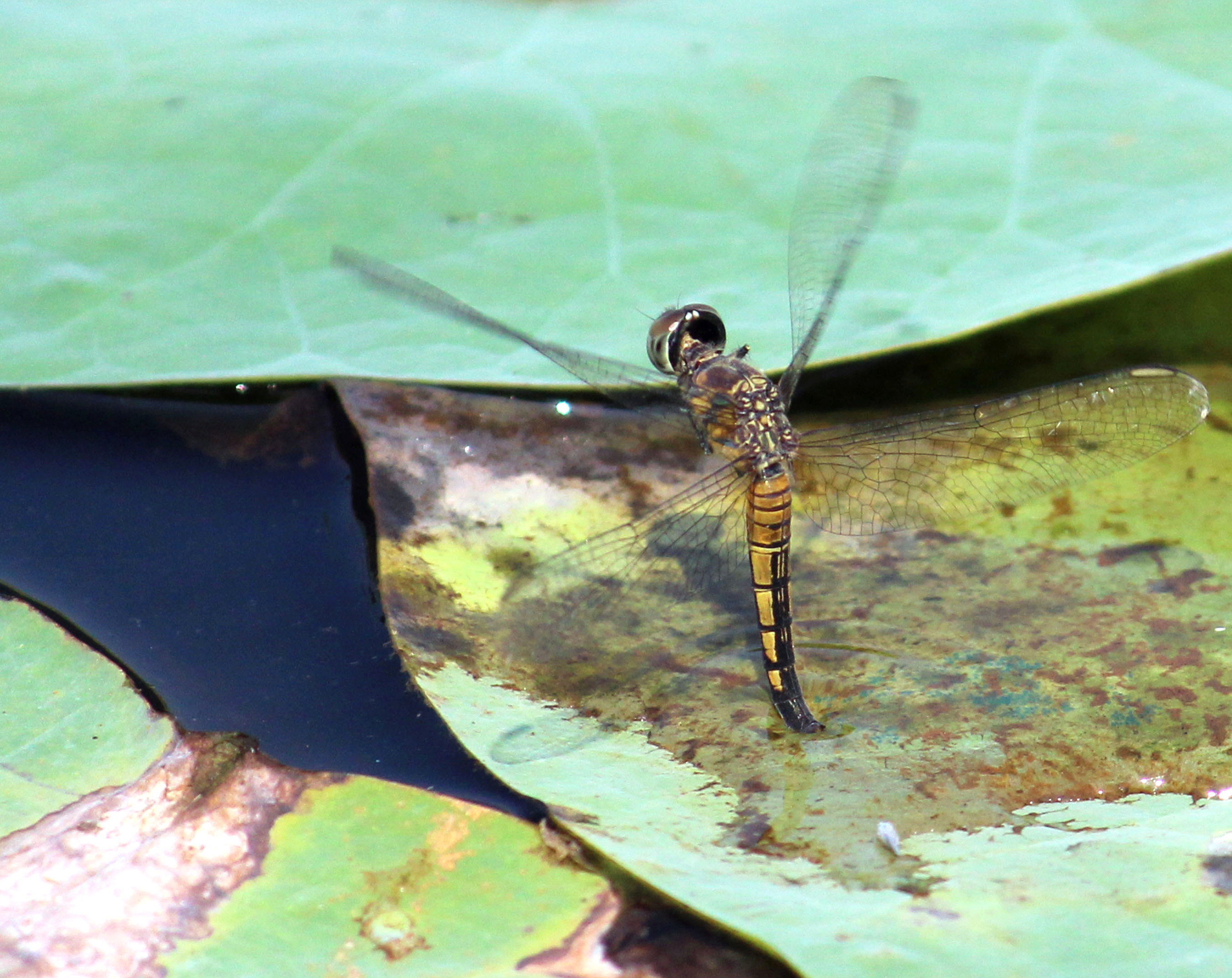
Egg laying

This species is found in many types of wet habitat, including brackish and disturbed waters. The males are seen more often, due to their territorial behavior. Females oviposit by "flicking" an egg mass out of the water into rocks and vegetation nearby.
