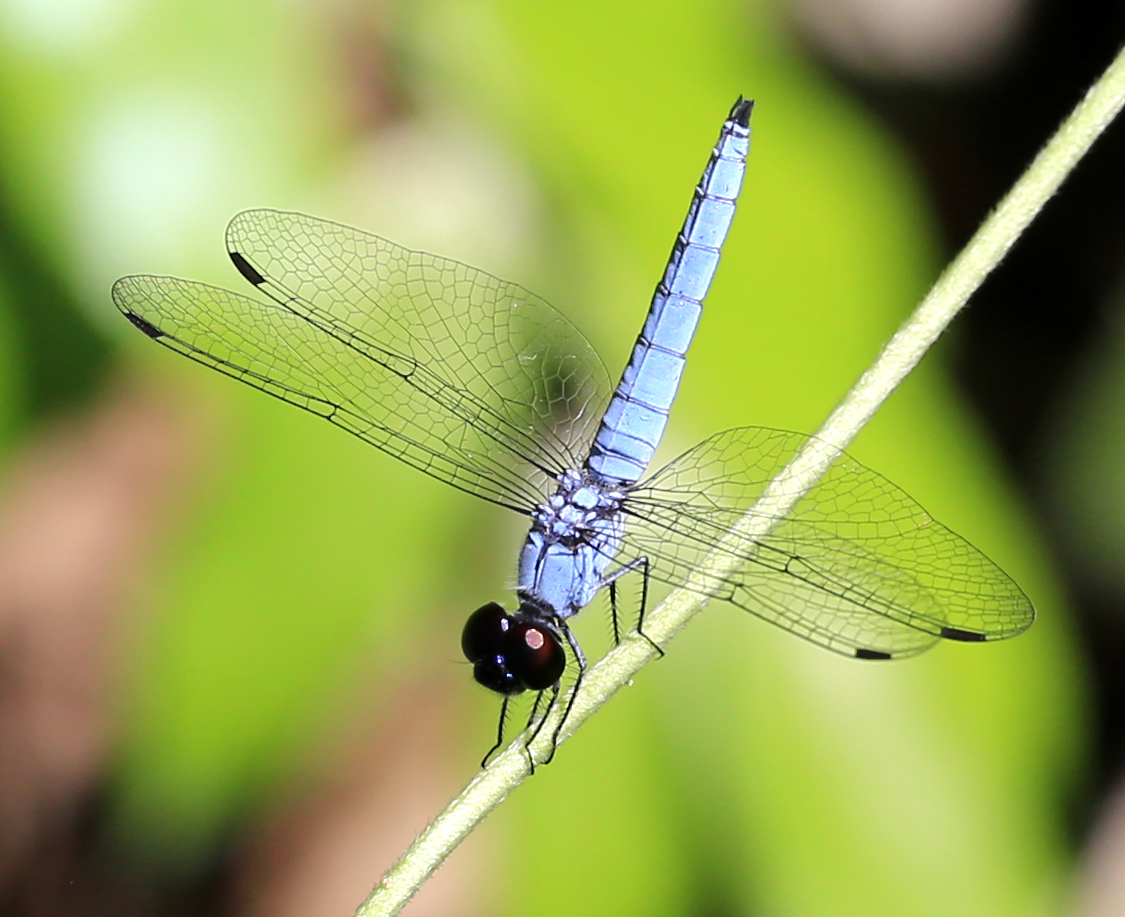
- Male
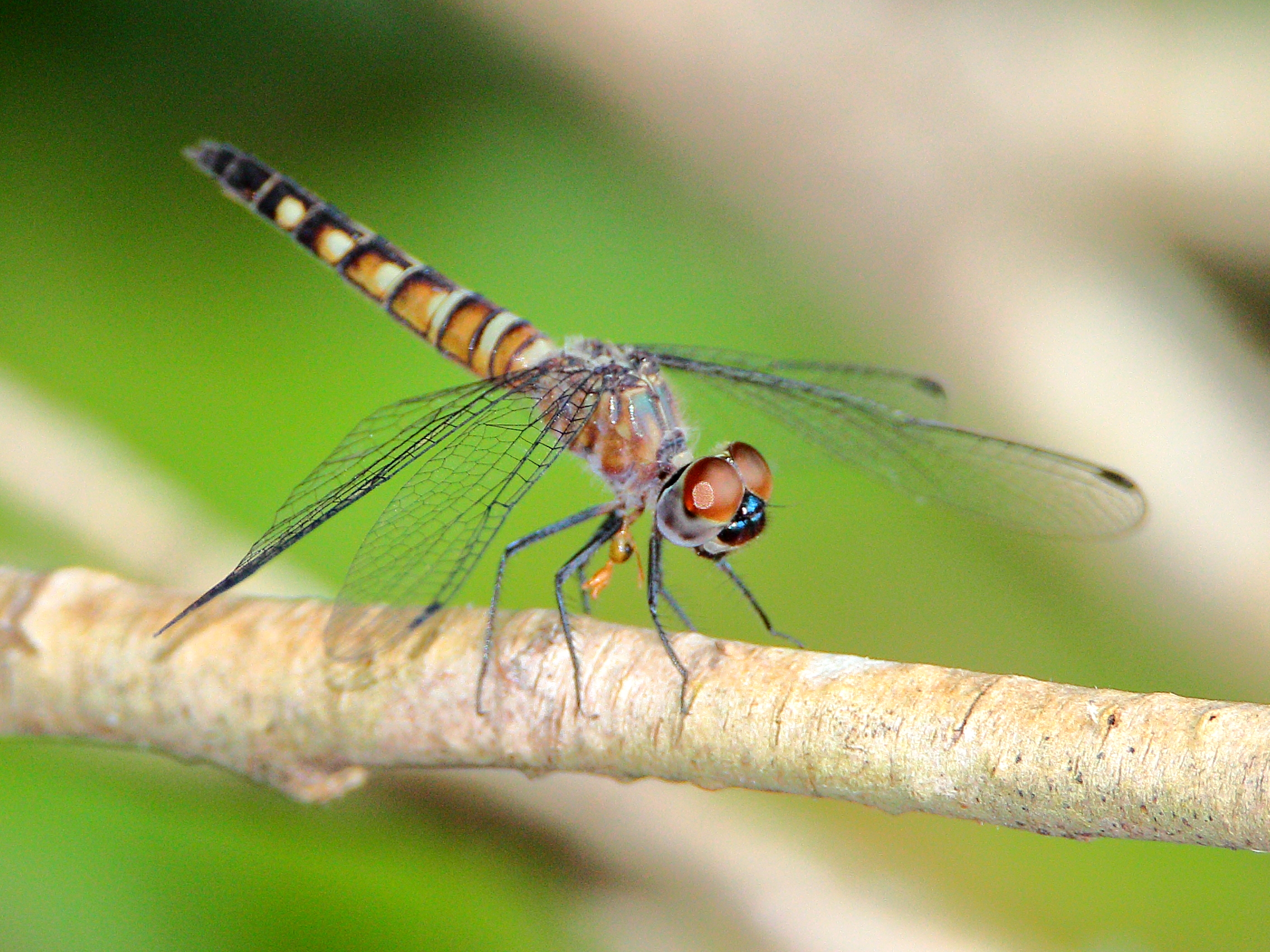
- Female

Conservation status
- Least Concern (IUCN 3.1)

Scientific classification
- Kingdom: Animalia
- Phylum: Arthropoda
- Clade: Pancrustacea
- Class: Insecta
- Order: Odonata
- Infraorder: Anisoptera
- Family: Libellulidae
- Genus: Brachydiplax
- Species: B. duivenbodei

Binomial name
- Brachydiplax duivenbodei (Brauer, 1866)

Synonyms
- Perithemis duivenbodei Brauer, 1866

= Brachydiplax duivenbodei =

Darkmouth

Species of dragonfly

Brachydiplax duivenbodei is a species of dragonfly in the family Libellulidae. It is known by the common name darkmouth. It is native to Indonesia, the Solomon Islands, and Queensland in Australia.

== Description ==
Males of this species are typical in colour for the genus, being bright powder blue on both the thorax and abdomen whereas females lack the pruinescence. The labrum is brown to black, thus giving the species its common name of darkmouth, as opposed to the similar palemouth (Brachydiplax denticauda). This species usually has seven antenodal crossveins in the fore-wing and six antenodal crossveins in the hind-wing. It is small in size with a wingspan of 40 to 60 millimeters. Though brightly coloured, the males often go unnoticed by an observer once they land on a lily pad or similar place.

== Habitat ==
This species can be found in habitat with still and slow-moving waters.

== Etymology ==
The genus name Brachydiplax is derived from the Greek βραχύς (brakhys, "short"), combined with Diplax, a genus name derived from the Greek δίς (dis, "twice") and πλάξ (plax, "flat and broad"). The name refers to the relationship of the genus to Diplax.

In 1866, Brauer named this species duivenbodei, an eponym honouring Maarten Dirk van Renesse van Duivenbode (1804-1878), then resident in Sulawesi, who provided specimens to Johann Jacob Kaup, director of the Hessisches Landesmuseum Darmstadt in Germany.

== Gallery ==
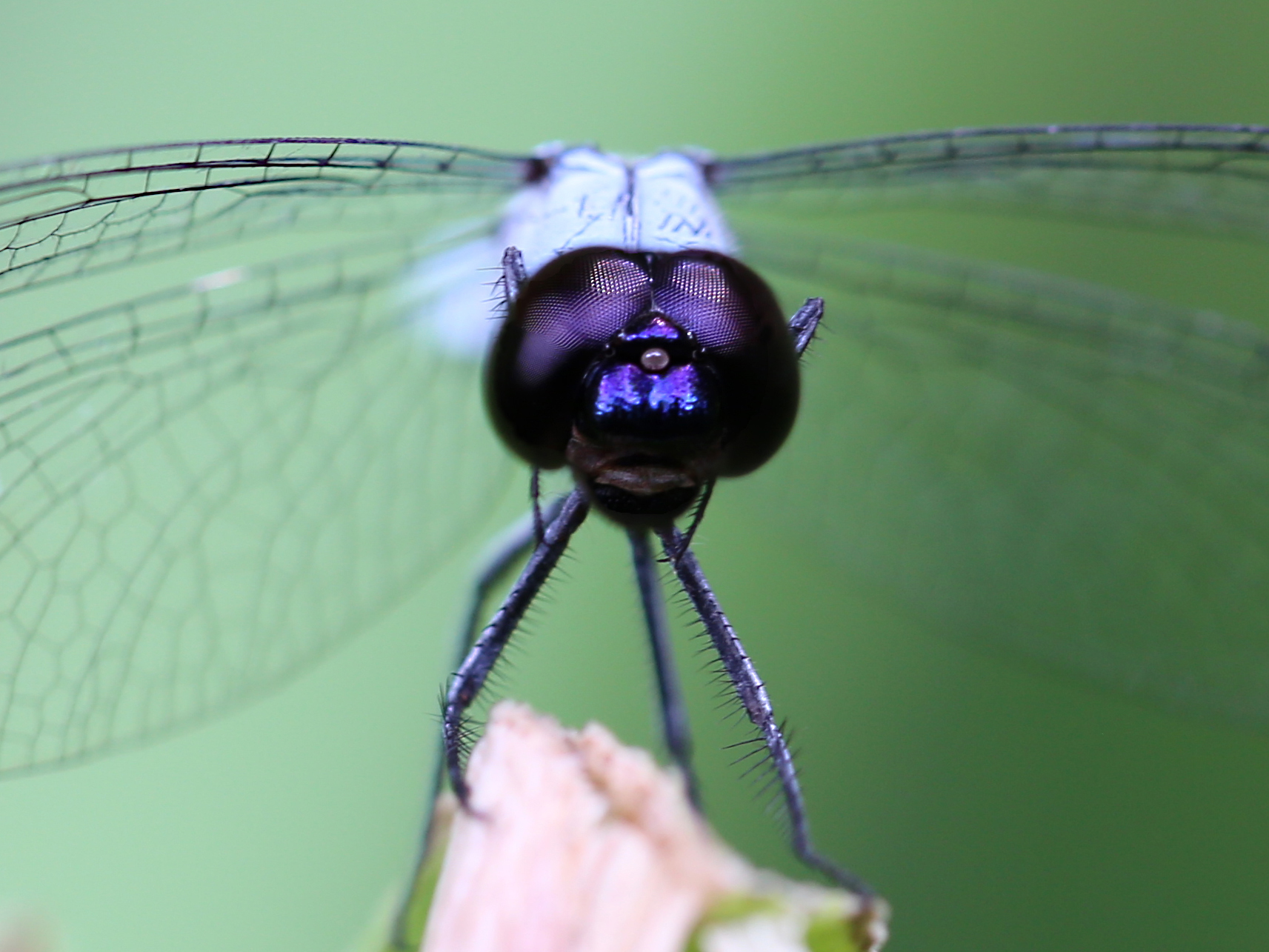
This head on view depicts the dark mouth

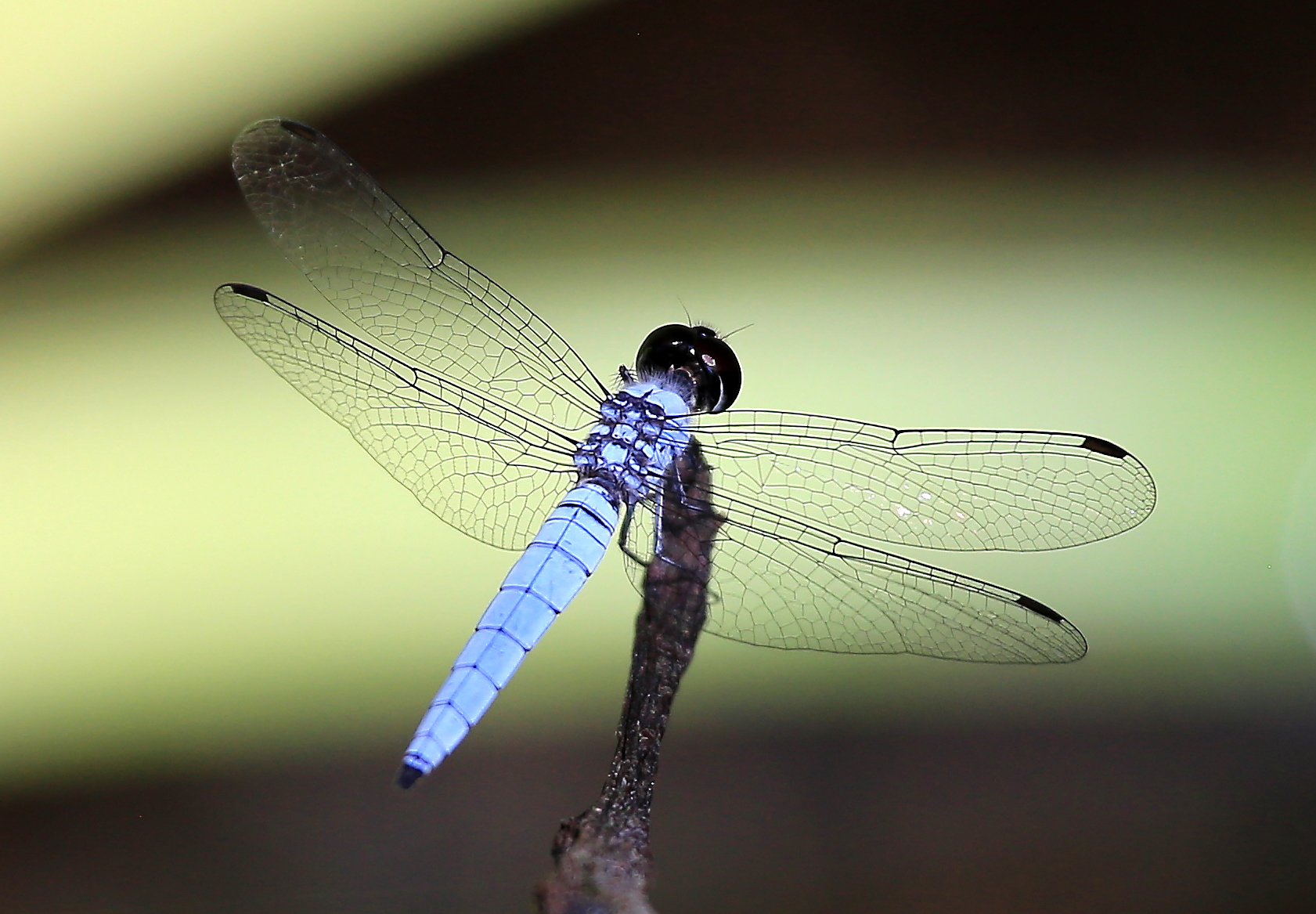
Highlighting seven antenodal crossveins in the forewing and six in the hindwing

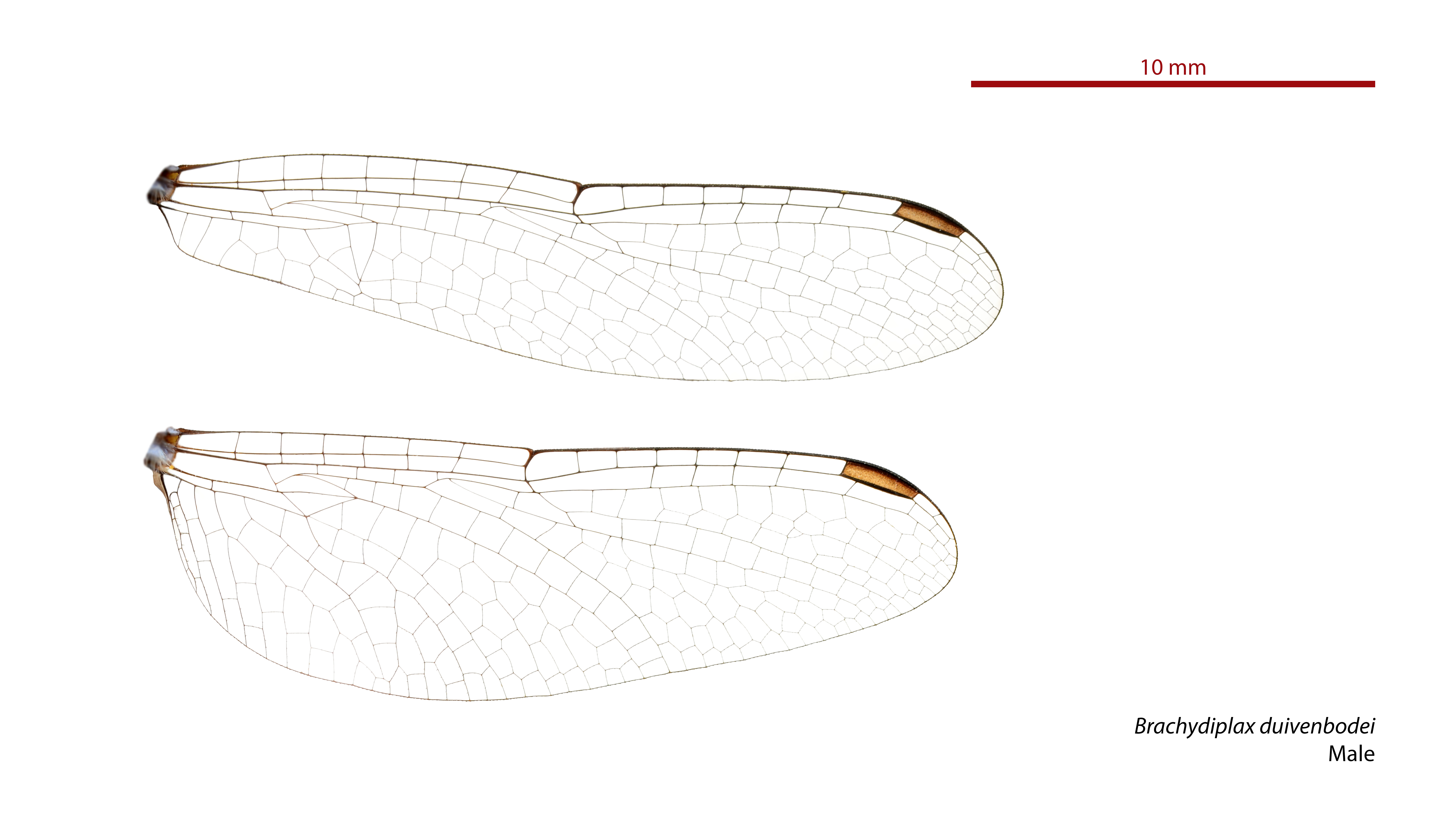
Male wings
