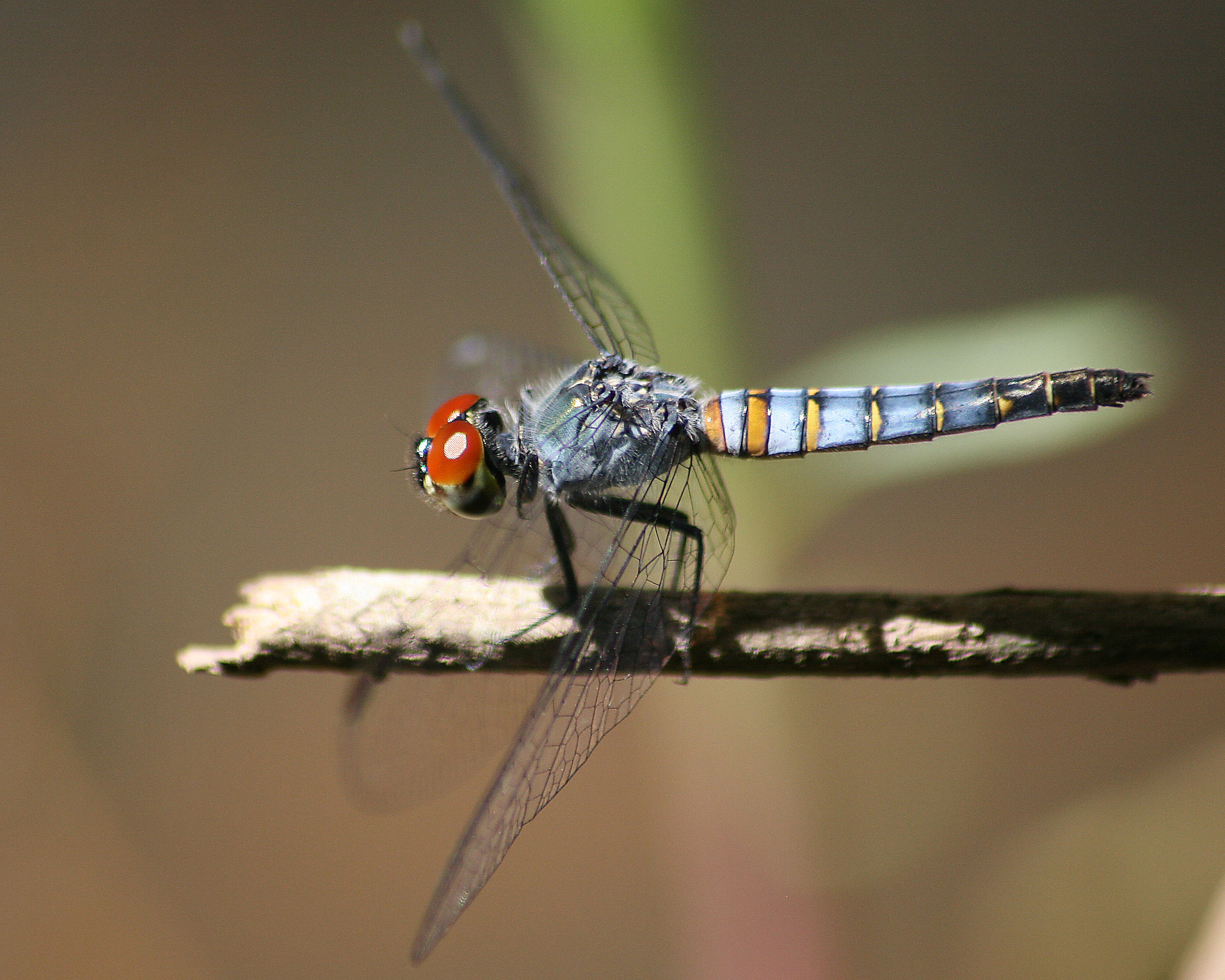
- Brachydiplax denticauda

Scientific classification
- Kingdom: Animalia
- Phylum: Arthropoda
- Clade: Pancrustacea
- Class: Insecta
- Order: Odonata
- Infraorder: Anisoptera
- Family: Libellulidae
- Subfamily: Brachydiplacinae
- Genus: Brachydiplax; Brauer, 1868

Synonyms
- Microthemis Brauer, 1868

= Brachydiplax =

Genus of dragonflies

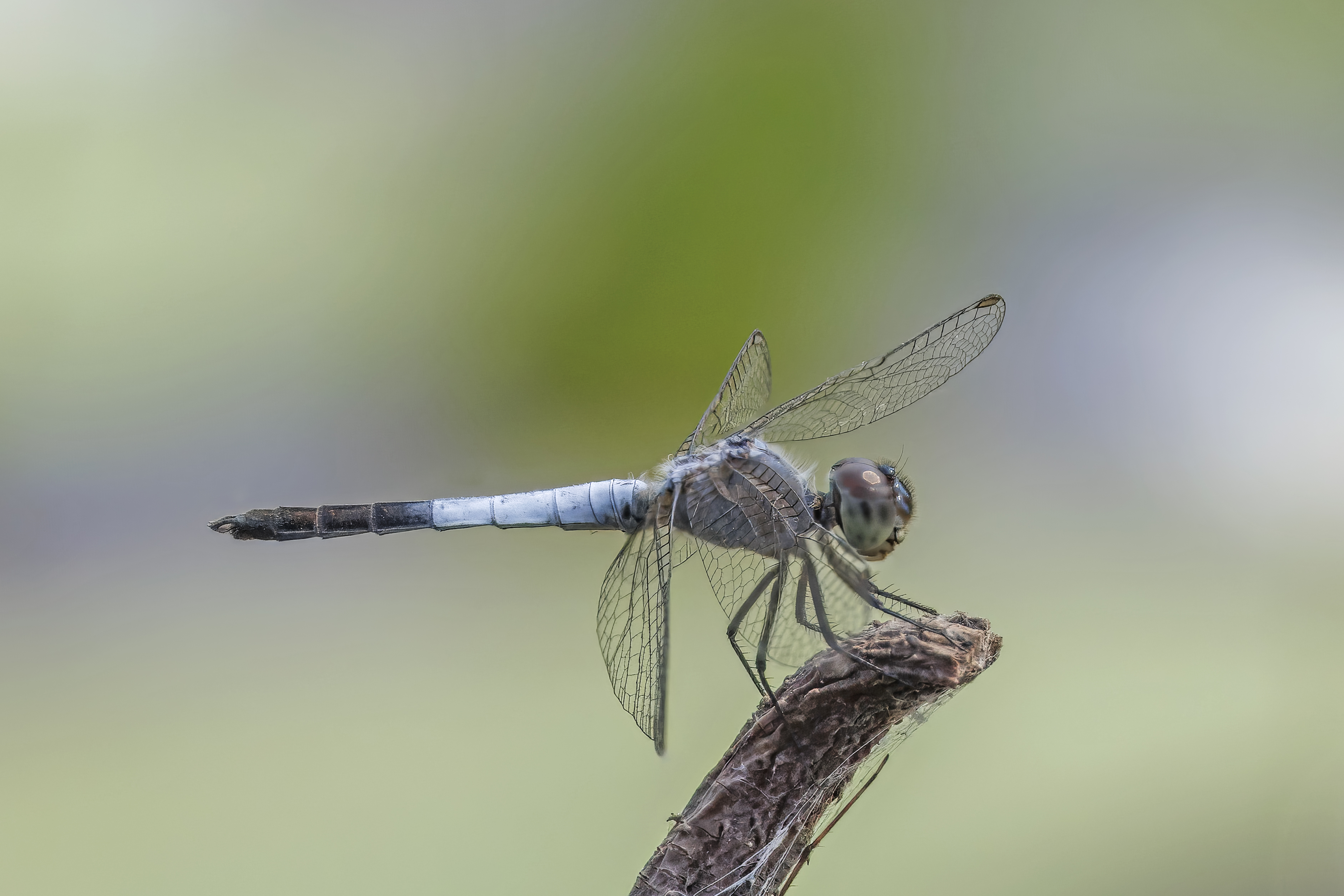
Brachydiplax farinosa male, Laos

Brachydiplax is a genus of dragonflies in the family Libellulidae. They occur in Asia from India to China and Southeast Asia, and New Guinea to Australia.

Species of Brachydiplax are often commonly found. Males of most species are usually pale to mid powder blue. Females have shades of brown, sometimes with neat patterns of spots on the abdomen, as in Brachydiplax chalybea flavovittata.

Like most Libellulids they tend to perch on sticks, reeds or stones near water, flying out to catch insects then returning to their perch.

== Etymology ==
The genus name Brachydiplax is derived from the Greek βραχύς (brakhys, "short"), combined with Diplax, a genus name derived from the Greek δίς (dis, "twice") and πλάξ (plax, "flat and broad"). The name refers to the relationship of the genus to Diplax.

== Species ==
The genus Brachydiplax includes the following species:

Male	Female	Scientific name	Common name	Distribution
		Brachydiplax chalybea Brauer, 1868	yellow-patched lieutenant, rufous-backed marsh hawk, and blue dasher	eastern Asia, from India to Japan to Indonesia.
		Brachydiplax denticauda (Brauer, 1867)	palemouth	Australia, Indonesia, Papua New Guinea, and the Solomon Islands.
		Brachydiplax duivenbodei (Brauer, 1866)	darkmouth	Indonesia, the Solomon Islands, and Queensland in Australia
		Brachydiplax farinosa Krüger, 1902		India
		Brachydiplax sobrina (Rambur, 1842)		Bangladesh, India, Myanmar, Nepal, Sri Lanka, and Thailand
		Brachydiplax sollaarti Lieftinck, 1953		Australia
		Brachydiplax yunnanensis Fraser, 1924		China
