= Utricularia simmonsii =

Scientific classification
- Kingdom: Plantae
- Clade: Tracheophytes
- Clade: Angiosperms
- Clade: Eudicots
- Clade: Asterids
- Order: Lamiales
- Family: Lentibulariaceae
- Genus: Utricularia
- Subgenus: Utricularia subg. Bivalvaria
- Section: Utricularia sect. Minutae; Lowrie, Cowie & Conran
- Species: U. simmonsii

Binomial name
- Utricularia simmonsii Lowrie, Cowie & Conran

Species of carnivorous plant

Utricularia simmonsii is a small annual or perennial terrestrial carnivorous plant that belongs to the genus Utricularia and is the only member of Utricularia sect. Minutae. U. simmonsii is endemic to Australia and is only known from a few locations in the Northern Territory and Queensland. It and the section Minutae were originally published and described by Allen Lowrie, Ian D. Cowie, and John Godfrey Conran in 2008. It was named in honor of Paul Simmons, who discovered the species in Queensland in 2005.

Lowrie et al. placed the section and species in subgenus Utricularia sensu Taylor (1989) or subgenus Bivalvaria sensu Müller & Borsch (2005), though the authors noted that it shares morphologically affinities with sections Enskide and Pleiochasia. A recent molecular phylogenetic study shows that U. simmonsii is allied with section Enskide of subgenus Bivalvaria.

== See also ==
- List of Utricularia species
