= Utricularia mangshanensis =

Scientific classification
- Kingdom: Plantae
- Clade: Tracheophytes
- Clade: Angiosperms
- Clade: Eudicots
- Clade: Asterids
- Order: Lamiales
- Family: Lentibulariaceae
- Genus: Utricularia
- Subgenus: Utricularia subg. Utricularia
- Section: Utricularia sect. Kamienskia
- Species: U. mangshanensis

Binomial name
- Utricularia mangshanensis G.W.Hu (2007)

Species of carnivorous plant

Utricularia mangshanensis is a carnivorous plant belonging to the genus Utricularia. This species is known only from the Mangshan Mountains of Hunan Province, China. It is thought to be most closely related to U. peranomala.

== See also ==
- List of Utricularia species
