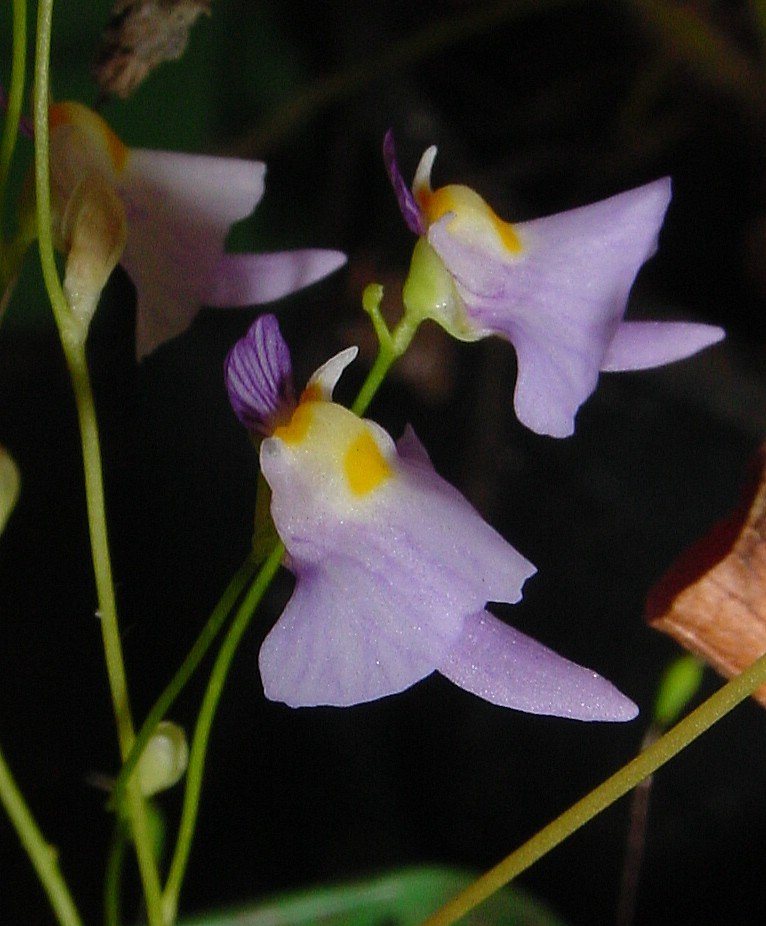

Scientific classification
- Kingdom: Plantae
- Clade: Tracheophytes
- Clade: Angiosperms
- Clade: Eudicots
- Clade: Asterids
- Order: Lamiales
- Family: Lentibulariaceae
- Genus: Utricularia
- Subgenus: Utricularia subg. Bivalvaria
- Section: Utricularia sect. Nigrescentes
- Species: U. warburgii

Binomial name
- Utricularia warburgii K.I.Goebel 1891

= Utricularia warburgii =

Species of carnivorous plant

Utricularia warburgii is a species of terrestrial bladderwort found in China, where it grows in sunny wet meadows at an altitude of 900 m. It belongs to the section Nigrescentes and is closely related to U. caerulea.

In the spring Utricularia warburgii produces 5–20 cm. flower scapes bearing 2-6 violet-blue flowers, 8mm in size and bearing a yellow splotch at the throat.

The cultivation of this species is not difficult, and is similar to other commonly cultivated terrestrial Utricularia. Plants are best grown in a mixture of peat and sand that is kept constantly moist to wet and placed in bright light conditions.

== Literature ==
- Goebel, K. I. 1890.: Ann. Jard. Bot. Buitenzorg. 9: 66.
- Taylor, P. The genus Utricularia – a taxonomic monograph. – Kew Bulletin additional series XIV, Royal Botanic Gardens, Kew, London.
