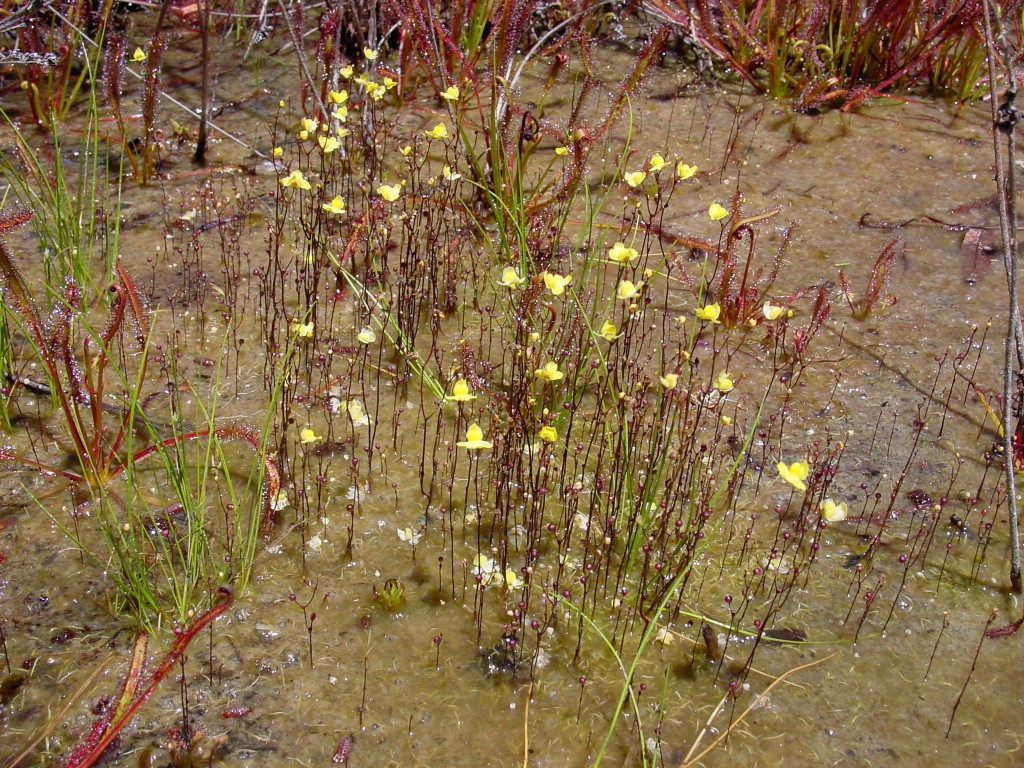
- A naturalized population of U. subulata in Mendocino County, California.

Scientific classification
- Kingdom: Plantae
- Clade: Tracheophytes
- Clade: Angiosperms
- Clade: Eudicots
- Clade: Asterids
- Order: Lamiales
- Family: Lentibulariaceae
- Genus: Utricularia
- Subgenus: Utricularia subg. Utricularia
- Section: Utricularia sect. Setiscapella
- Species: U. subulata

Binomial name
- Utricularia subulata L.

= Utricularia subulata =

Species of carnivorous plant

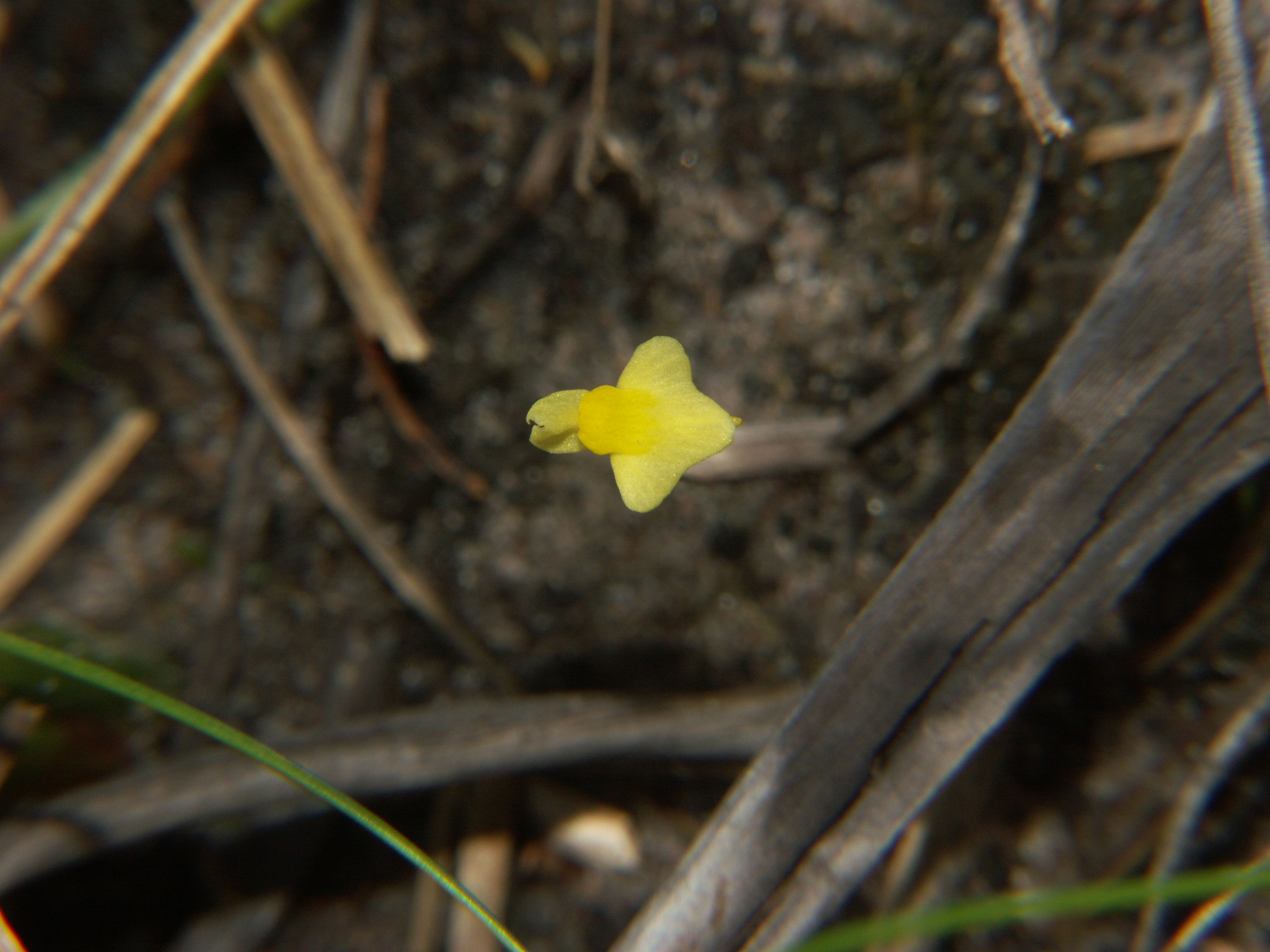
Utricularia subulata on Cobourg Peninsula in the Northern Territory of Australia

Utricularia subulata, the zigzag bladderwort, is a small annual, terrestrial carnivorous plant that belongs to the genus Utricularia (family Lentibulariaceae). It is the most widely distributed species in the genus, being almost pantropical.

It is native to the Americas, Africa, and Australia

== See also ==
- List of Utricularia species
