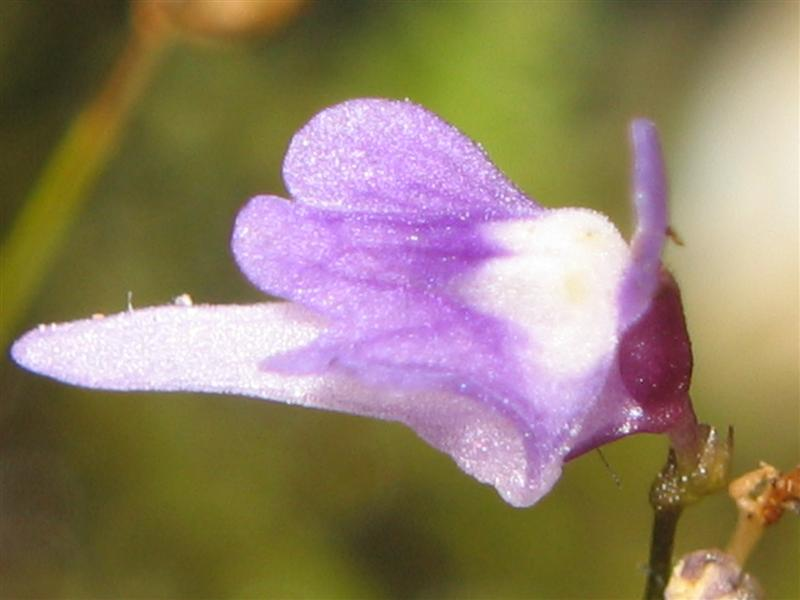

Scientific classification
- Kingdom: Plantae
- Clade: Tracheophytes
- Clade: Angiosperms
- Clade: Eudicots
- Clade: Asterids
- Order: Lamiales
- Family: Lentibulariaceae
- Genus: Utricularia
- Subgenus: Utricularia subg. Utricularia
- Section: Utricularia sect. Meionula
- Species: U. minutissima

Binomial name
- Utricularia minutissima Vahl

= Utricularia minutissima =

Species of carnivorous plant

Utricularia minutissima is a small or very small terrestrial carnivorous plant that belongs to the genus Utricularia. U. minutissima is native to Asia (Burma, Cambodia, China, India, Indonesia, Japan, Laos, Malaysia, the Philippines, Sri Lanka, Thailand, Vietnam) and Australia. Among the islands of Southeast Asia, it is found on Borneo, New Guinea, and Sumatra.

It was originally described and published by Martin Vahl in 1804. It grows as a terrestrial plant in damp or wet open areas with muddy or sandy soils at altitudes from sea level to 2,100 m (6,890 ft). It has been collected in flower between July and December.

== Synonyms ==
- Meionula parviflora Raf.
- U. barnesii F.E.Lloyd
- U. brevilabris Lace
- U. brevilabris var. parviflora Pellegr.
- U. calliphysa Stapf
- U. capillacea Wight
- U. evrardii Pellegr.
- U. lilliput Pellegr.
- U. minutissima f. albiflora (Komiya) Komiya & C.Shibata
- U. nigricaulis Ridl.
- U. nipponica Makino
- U. nipponica f. albiflora Komiya
- U. pygmaea R.Br.
- U. siamensis Ostenf.
- Vesiculina pygmaea (R.Br.) Raf.

== See also ==
- List of Utricularia species
