= Utricularia leptoplectra =

Scientific classification
- Kingdom: Plantae
- Clade: Tracheophytes
- Clade: Angiosperms
- Clade: Eudicots
- Clade: Asterids
- Order: Lamiales
- Family: Lentibulariaceae
- Genus: Utricularia
- Subgenus: Utricularia subg. Utricularia
- Section: Utricularia sect. Nelipus
- Species: U. leptoplectra

Binomial name
- Utricularia leptoplectra F.Muell. 1885

Species of carnivorous plant

Utricularia leptoplectra is a terrestrial or subaquatic carnivorous plant that belongs to the genus Utricularia (family Lentibulariaceae). It is endemic to Australia with a distribution in the Northern Territory from the area around Darwin, east to the Arnhem Land plateau, south to Katherine, and west to the western Kimberley region in Western Australia.

== See also ==
- List of Utricularia species
