= Utricularia trichophylla =

Scientific classification
- Kingdom: Plantae
- Clade: Tracheophytes
- Clade: Angiosperms
- Clade: Eudicots
- Clade: Asterids
- Order: Lamiales
- Family: Lentibulariaceae
- Genus: Utricularia
- Subgenus: Utricularia subg. Utricularia
- Section: Utricularia sect. Setiscapella
- Species: U. trichophylla

Binomial name
- Utricularia trichophylla Spruce ex Oliv. 1860

Species of plant

Utricularia trichophylla is an aquatic or terrestrial carnivorous plant that belongs to the genus Utricularia (family Lentibulariaceae). It is native to Central and South America where it can be found in Belize, Bolivia, Brazil, French Guiana, Guyana, Nicaragua, Paraguay, Peru, Suriname, Trinidad, and Venezuela.

== See also ==
- List of Utricularia species
