= Utricularia neottioides =

Scientific classification
- Kingdom: Plantae
- Clade: Embryophytes
- Clade: Tracheophytes
- Clade: Angiosperms
- Clade: Eudicots
- Clade: Asterids
- Order: Lamiales
- Family: Lentibulariaceae
- Genus: Utricularia
- Subgenus: Utricularia subg. Utricularia
- Section: Utricularia sect. Avesicaria
- Species: U. neottioides

Binomial name
- Utricularia neottioides A.St.Hil & Girard 1838

Synonyms
- U. herzogii Luetz. 1909 U. glazioviana Warm. ex Glaz. 1911 Avesicaria neottioides (A.St.Hil & Girard) Barnhart 1916

Species of carnivorous plant

Utricularia neottioides is a perennial, affixed aquatic carnivorous plant that belongs to the genus Utricularia (family Lentibulariaceae). It is a mat-forming rheophyte that is attached to rocks in the shallows of swiftly moving water. It is endemic to South America and is found in the countries of Colombia, Venezuela, Brazil, and Bolivia.

== See also ==
- List of Utricularia species
