= Utricularia cochleata =

Scientific classification
- Kingdom: Plantae
- Clade: Tracheophytes
- Clade: Angiosperms
- Clade: Eudicots
- Clade: Asterids
- Order: Lamiales
- Family: Lentibulariaceae
- Genus: Utricularia
- Subgenus: Utricularia subg. Utricularia
- Section: Utricularia sect. Steyermarkia
- Species: U. cochleata

Binomial name
- Utricularia cochleata C.P.Bove

Species of carnivorous plant

Utricularia cochleata is a small, bryophyllous, lithophytic carnivorous plant that belongs to the genus Utricularia. It is endemic to Brazil and is only known from the type location in Goiás. It grows as a terrestrial lithophyte on mossy rocks within the range of the spray of a waterfall. The species epithet cochleata refers to the shell-like shape of the recurved corolla. U. cochleata was first collected in 2004 and formally described by Claudia Petean Bove in 2008.

== See also ==
- List of Utricularia species
