= Utricularia stanfieldii =

Scientific classification
- Kingdom: Plantae
- Clade: Tracheophytes
- Clade: Angiosperms
- Clade: Eudicots
- Clade: Asterids
- Order: Lamiales
- Family: Lentibulariaceae
- Genus: Utricularia
- Subgenus: Utricularia subg. Utricularia
- Section: Utricularia sect. Setiscapella
- Species: U. stanfieldii

Binomial name
- Utricularia stanfieldii P.Taylor 1963

Species of carnivorous plant

Utricularia stanfieldii is an annual, terrestrial carnivorous plant that belongs to the genus Utricularia (family Lentibulariaceae). It is endemic to western tropical Africa including ranges in Côte d'Ivoire, Liberia, Nigeria, Sierra Leone, and Togo.

== See also ==
- List of Utricularia species
