= Utricularia hirta =

Scientific classification
- Kingdom: Plantae
- Clade: Tracheophytes
- Clade: Angiosperms
- Clade: Eudicots
- Clade: Asterids
- Order: Lamiales
- Family: Lentibulariaceae
- Genus: Utricularia
- Subgenus: Utricularia subg. Utricularia
- Section: Utricularia sect. Meionula
- Species: U. hirta

Binomial name
- Utricularia hirta Klein ex Link

Synonyms
- [U. capillacea Vahl]; U. hirta var. elongata Pellegr.; U. setacea Wall.; U. tayloriana Joseph & Mani

Species of carnivorous plant

Utricularia hirta is a small, probably perennial, terrestrial carnivorous plant that belongs to the genus Utricularia. U. hirta is native to India and Southeast Asia, where it can be found in Bangladesh, Cambodia, Laos, Sri Lanka, Thailand, and Vietnam and on the island of Borneo. It was originally named by Jacob Theodor Klein and formally described and published by Johann Heinrich Friedrich Link in 1820. It grows as a terrestrial plant in damp or wet open areas or marshes at altitudes from sea level to 1,000 m (3,281 ft). It has been collected in flower between July and December.

== See also ==
- List of Utricularia species
