= Utricularia aureomaculata =

Scientific classification
- Kingdom: Plantae
- Clade: Embryophytes
- Clade: Tracheophytes
- Clade: Angiosperms
- Clade: Eudicots
- Clade: Asterids
- Order: Lamiales
- Family: Lentibulariaceae
- Genus: Utricularia
- Subgenus: Utricularia subg. Utricularia
- Section: Utricularia sect. Steyermarkia
- Species: U. aureomaculata

Binomial name
- Utricularia aureomaculata Steyerm.

Species of carnivorous plant

Utricularia aureomaculata is a small, probably annual, lithophyte carnivorous plant that belongs to the genus Utricularia. U. aureomaculata is endemic to Venezuela and is only known from three locations: the type location on Ptari-tepui in the Venezuelan state of Bolívar, one other location from Ptari-tepuí, and also from Amaruay-tepui. It grows as a terrestrial lithophyte on moist mossy bluffs. It has been collected in flower in May, October, and November. It was originally described and published by Julian Alfred Steyermark in 1953.

== See also ==
- List of Utricularia species
