= Utricularia nervosa =

Scientific classification
- Kingdom: Plantae
- Clade: Embryophytes
- Clade: Tracheophytes
- Clade: Angiosperms
- Clade: Eudicots
- Clade: Asterids
- Order: Lamiales
- Family: Lentibulariaceae
- Genus: Utricularia
- Subgenus: Utricularia subg. Utricularia
- Section: Utricularia sect. Setiscapella
- Species: U. nervosa

Binomial name
- Utricularia nervosa G.Weber ex Benj. 1847

Species of carnivorous plant

Utricularia nervosa is a terrestrial carnivorous plant that belongs to the genus Utricularia (family Lentibulariaceae). It is endemic to South America where it can be found in Argentina, Brazil, Colombia, Paraguay, and Venezuela.

== See also ==
- List of Utricularia species
