= Utricularia mirabilis =

Scientific classification
- Kingdom: Plantae
- Clade: Embryophytes
- Clade: Tracheophytes
- Clade: Angiosperms
- Clade: Eudicots
- Clade: Asterids
- Order: Lamiales
- Family: Lentibulariaceae
- Genus: Utricularia
- Subgenus: Utricularia subg. Utricularia
- Section: Utricularia sect. Mirabiles
- Species: U. mirabilis

Binomial name
- Utricularia mirabilis P.Taylor

Synonyms
- [U. heterochroma P.Taylor]

Species of carnivorous plant

Utricularia mirabilis is a small, perennial, rheophytic carnivorous plant that belongs to the genus Utricularia. U. mirabilis is endemic to Venezuela, where it is known from the type location near Campo Grande. It grows as a rheophyte in creek beds of shallow running water at altitudes around 1,500 m (4,921 ft). It has been collected in fruit and flower in December. It was originally described and published by Peter Taylor in 1986.

== See also ==
- List of Utricularia species
