= Utricularia determannii =

Scientific classification
- Kingdom: Plantae
- Clade: Tracheophytes
- Clade: Angiosperms
- Clade: Eudicots
- Clade: Asterids
- Order: Lamiales
- Family: Lentibulariaceae
- Genus: Utricularia
- Subgenus: Utricularia subg. Utricularia
- Section: Utricularia sect. Choristothecae
- Species: U. determannii

Binomial name
- Utricularia determannii P.Taylor

Species of carnivorous plant

Utricularia determannii is a very small, probably perennial, rheophytic carnivorous plant that belongs to the genus Utricularia. U. determannii is endemic to Suriname, where it is only known from the type location in the Wilhelmina Mountains. It grows as a rheophyte on bare granite rocks in dripping water at altitudes up to 900 m (2,953 ft). It has been collected in flower in July. It was originally described and published by Peter Taylor in 1986 and named in honor of the American collector R. O. Determann.

== See also ==
- List of Utricularia species
