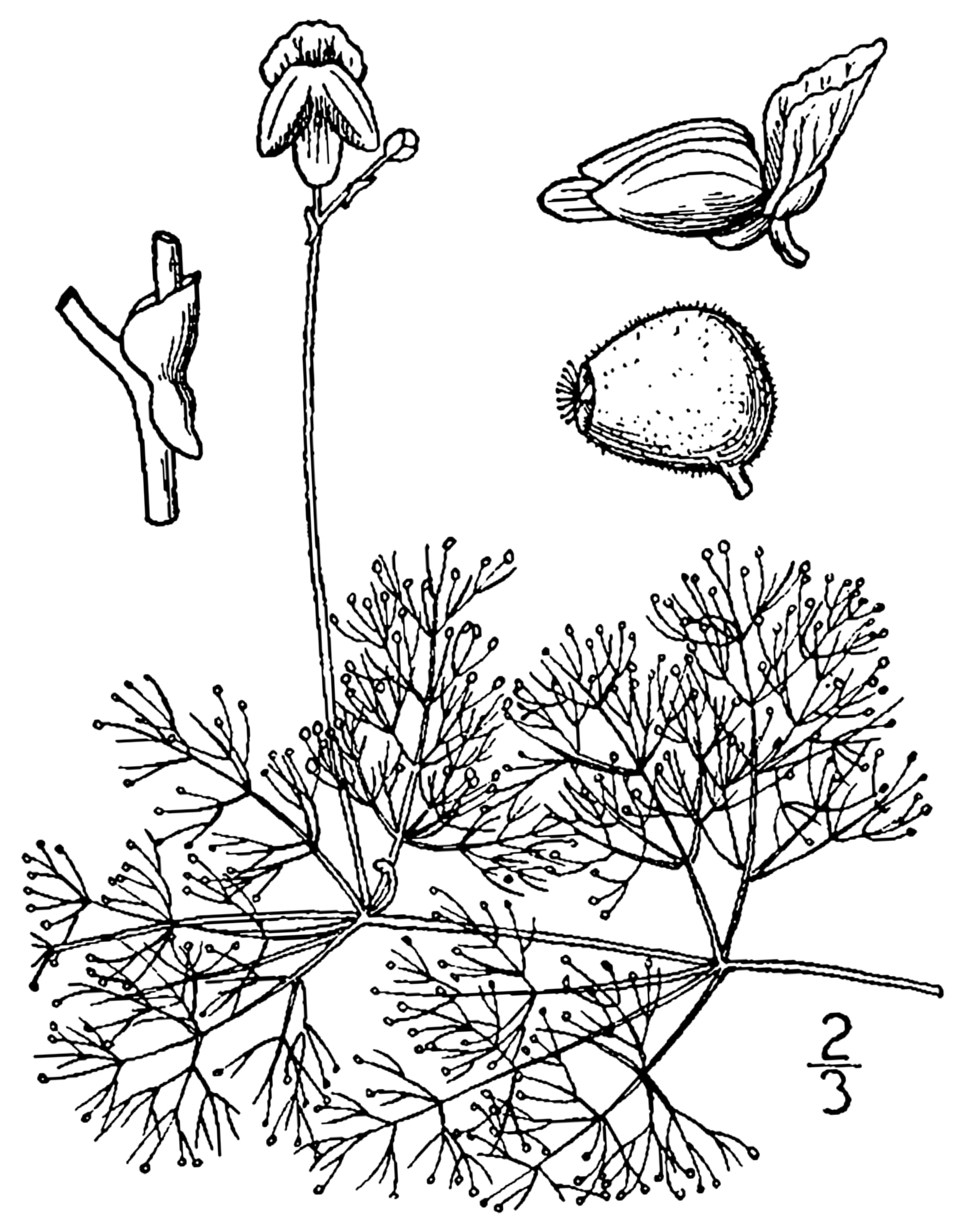
- Utricularia purpurea Walter - eastern purple bladderwort

Scientific classification
- Kingdom: Plantae
- Clade: Tracheophytes
- Clade: Angiosperms
- Clade: Eudicots
- Clade: Asterids
- Order: Lamiales
- Family: Lentibulariaceae
- Genus: Utricularia
- Subgenus: Utricularia subg. Utricularia
- Section: Utricularia sect. Vesiculina
- Species: U. purpurea

Binomial name
- Utricularia purpurea Walter

Synonyms
- U. saccata Elliott nom. illeg.; U. violacea Barton nom. illeg.; Vesiculina purpurea (Walter) Raf.; Vesiculina saccata (Elliott) Raf.

= Utricularia purpurea =

Species of carnivorous plant

Utricularia purpurea, the eastern purple bladderwort, is a medium-sized suspended aquatic carnivorous plant that belongs to the genus Utricularia. U. purpurea is endemic to North and Central America. It has been suggested that U. purpurea may have partially lost its appetite for carnivory. Richards (2001) did an extensive study in the field on it and noted that trapping rates of the usual Utricularia prey were significantly lower than in other species in the genus. Richards concludes that this species can still trap and digest arthropod prey in its specialized bladder traps, but does so sparingly. Instead, it harbors a community of algae, zooplankton, and debris in the bladders that indicates U. purpurea favors a mutualistic interaction in place of a predator–prey relationship.

U. purpurea has leaves that are whorled or alternately arranged. Scapes may reach up to 5 decimeters (approximately 20 inches) in height.

== See also ==
- List of Utricularia species
