= Utricularia myriocista =

Scientific classification
- Kingdom: Plantae
- Clade: Tracheophytes
- Clade: Angiosperms
- Clade: Eudicots
- Clade: Asterids
- Order: Lamiales
- Family: Lentibulariaceae
- Genus: Utricularia
- Subgenus: Utricularia subg. Utricularia
- Section: Utricularia sect. Vesiculina
- Species: U. myriocista

Binomial name
- Utricularia myriocista A.St.-Hil. & Girard

Synonyms
- U. amoena Pilg.; U. magnifica Pilg.; U. pulcherrima Sylvén; [U. purpurea Warm.]

Species of carnivorous plant

Utricularia myriocista is a medium-sized suspended aquatic carnivorous plant that belongs to the genus Utricularia. U. myriocista is endemic to South America and can be found in Argentina, Bolivia, Brazil, French Guiana, Guyana, Suriname, Trinidad, and Venezuela.

== See also ==
- List of Utricularia species
