= Utricularia choristotheca =

Scientific classification
- Kingdom: Plantae
- Clade: Tracheophytes
- Clade: Angiosperms
- Clade: Eudicots
- Clade: Asterids
- Order: Lamiales
- Family: Lentibulariaceae
- Genus: Utricularia
- Subgenus: Utricularia subg. Utricularia
- Section: Utricularia sect. Choristothecae
- Species: U. choristotheca

Binomial name
- Utricularia choristotheca P.Taylor

Species of carnivorous plant

Utricularia choristotheca is a very small, probably perennial, rheophytic carnivorous plant that belongs to the genus Utricularia. U. choristotheca is endemic to Suriname, where it is only known from the type location, and French Guiana, where it is found on Montagne des Nouragues. It grows as a rheophyte on bare granite rocks in dripping water at altitudes up to 900 m (2,953 ft). It has been collected in flower or fruit in July. It was originally described and published by Peter Taylor in 1986.

== See also ==
- List of Utricularia species
