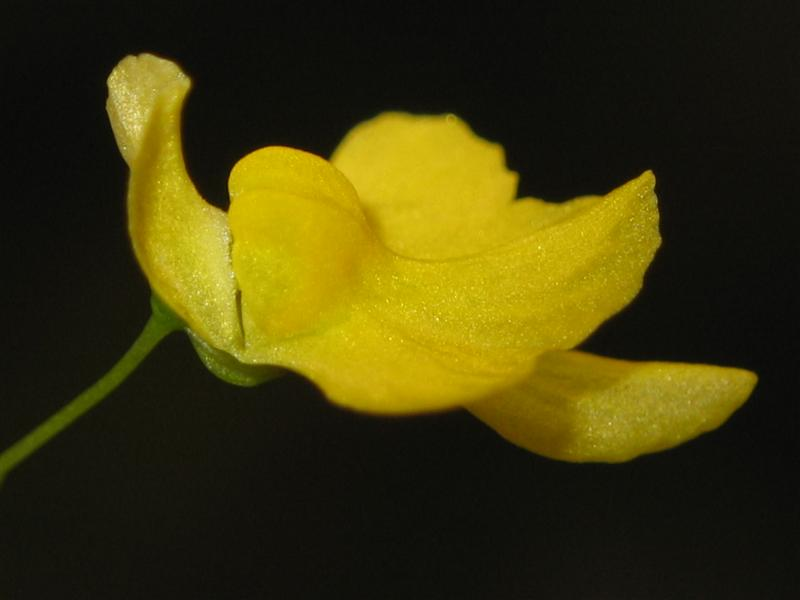

Scientific classification
- Kingdom: Plantae
- Clade: Embryophytes
- Clade: Tracheophytes
- Clade: Angiosperms
- Clade: Eudicots
- Clade: Asterids
- Order: Lamiales
- Family: Lentibulariaceae
- Genus: Utricularia
- Subgenus: Utricularia subg. Utricularia
- Section: Utricularia sect. Setiscapella
- Species: U. triloba

Binomial name
- Utricularia triloba Benj. 1847

= Utricularia triloba =

Species of plant

Utricularia triloba is a small annual, terrestrial carnivorous plant that belongs to the genus Utricularia (family Lentibulariaceae). It is native to Central and South America and is found in the following countries: Argentina, Belize, Bolivia, Brazil, Colombia, French Guiana, Guyana, Paraguay, Peru, Suriname, and Venezuela.

== See also ==
- List of Utricularia species
