= Utricularia limosa =

Conservation status
- Least Concern (IUCN 3.1)

Scientific classification
- Kingdom: Plantae
- Clade: Tracheophytes
- Clade: Angiosperms
- Clade: Eudicots
- Clade: Asterids
- Order: Lamiales
- Family: Lentibulariaceae
- Genus: Utricularia
- Subgenus: Utricularia subg. Utricularia
- Section: Utricularia sect. Nelipus
- Species: U. limosa

Binomial name
- Utricularia limosa R.Br. 1810

Synonyms
- Nelipus limosa (R.Br.) Raf. 1838; U. verticillata Benj. 1847

Species of carnivorous plant

Utricularia limosa is a terrestrial or subaquatic carnivorous plant that belongs to the genus Utricularia (family Lentibulariaceae). It is native to Southeast Asia (Laos, Malaysia, Thailand and Vietnam), Australia (Northern Territory, Queensland and Western Australia), China and New Guinea.

== See also ==
- List of Utricularia species
