= Utricularia nigrescens =

Scientific classification
- Kingdom: Plantae
- Clade: Tracheophytes
- Clade: Angiosperms
- Clade: Eudicots
- Clade: Asterids
- Order: Lamiales
- Family: Lentibulariaceae
- Genus: Utricularia
- Subgenus: Utricularia subg. Utricularia
- Section: Utricularia sect. Setiscapella
- Species: U. nigrescens

Binomial name
- Utricularia nigrescens Sylvén 1908

Species of carnivorous plant

Utricularia nigrescens is a terrestrial carnivorous plant that belongs to the genus Utricularia (family Lentibulariaceae). It is endemic to Brazil.

== See also ==
- List of Utricularia species
