= Utricularia oliveriana =

Scientific classification
- Kingdom: Plantae
- Clade: Embryophytes
- Clade: Tracheophytes
- Clade: Angiosperms
- Clade: Eudicots
- Clade: Asterids
- Order: Lamiales
- Family: Lentibulariaceae
- Genus: Utricularia
- Subgenus: Utricularia subg. Utricularia
- Section: Utricularia sect. Avesicaria
- Species: U. oliveriana

Binomial name
- Utricularia oliveriana Steyerm. 1953

Synonyms
- U. neottioides var. pedicellata Oliver 1860 U. oliveriana f. parva Steyerm. 1953

Species of carnivorous plant

Utricularia oliveriana is an affixed aquatic carnivorous plant that belongs to the genus Utricularia (family Lentibulariaceae). It is endemic to South America where it can be found in Brazil, Colombia, and Venezuela.

== See also ==
- List of Utricularia species
