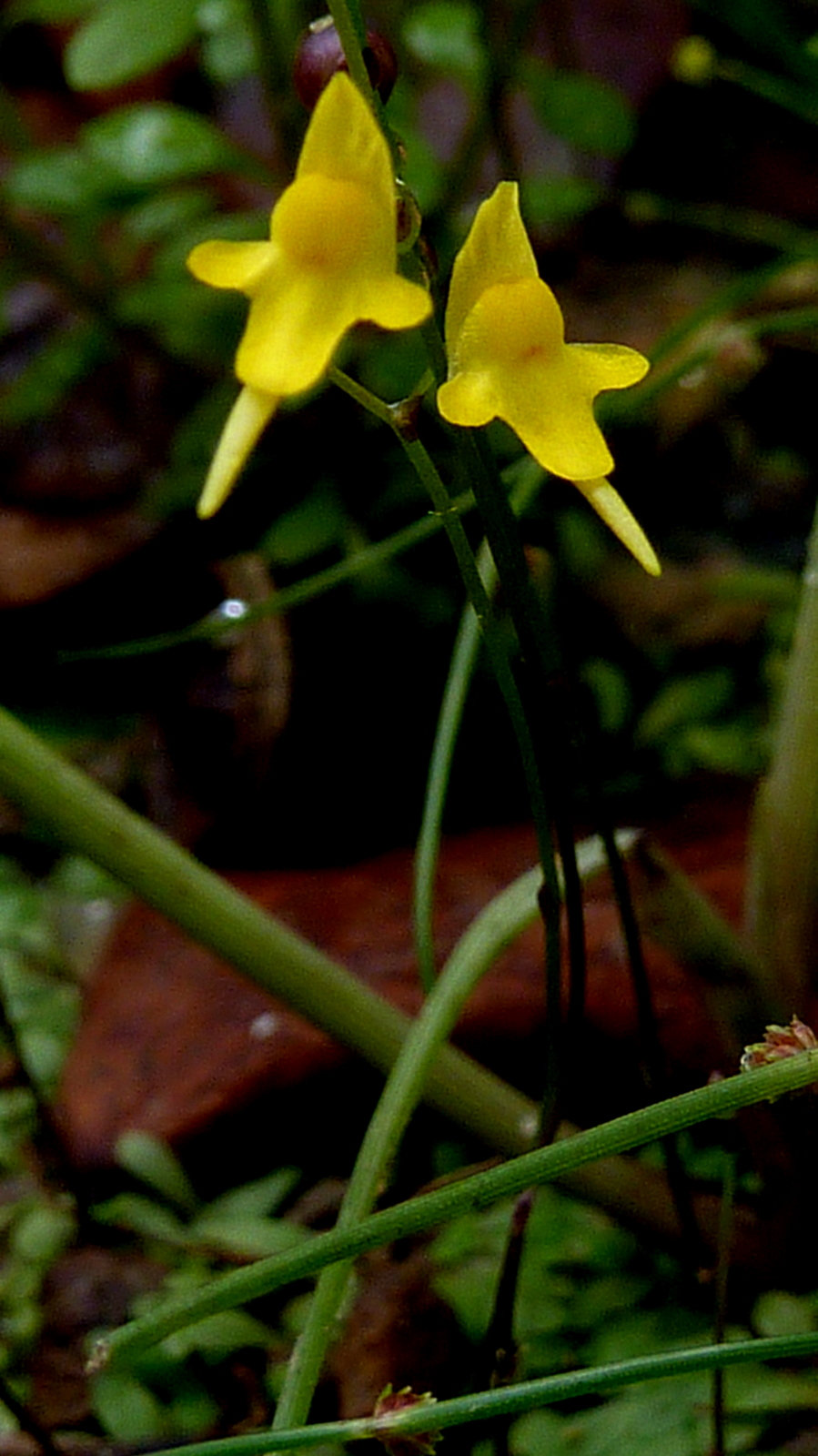

Conservation status
- Least Concern (IUCN 3.1)

Scientific classification
- Kingdom: Plantae
- Clade: Tracheophytes
- Clade: Angiosperms
- Clade: Eudicots
- Clade: Asterids
- Order: Lamiales
- Family: Lentibulariaceae
- Genus: Utricularia
- Subgenus: Utricularia subg. Utricularia
- Section: Utricularia sect. Setiscapella
- Species: U. pusilla

Binomial name
- Utricularia pusilla Vahl 1804

= Utricularia pusilla =

Species of plant

Utricularia pusilla, the tiny bladderwort, is an annual, terrestrial carnivorous plant that belongs to the genus Utricularia (family Lentibulariaceae). Its distribution includes ranges in Mexico, the Caribbean, and Central and South America: specifically in Argentina, Belize, Bolivia, Brazil, Colombia, Costa Rica, Cuba, Dominica, the Dominican Republic, Ecuador, French Guiana, Guatemala, Guyana, Honduras, Jamaica, Nicaragua, Panama, Paraguay, Peru, Puerto Rico, Suriname, Trinidad and Tobago, and Venezuela.

== See also ==
- List of Utricularia species
