= Utricularia steyermarkii =

Scientific classification
- Kingdom: Plantae
- Clade: Embryophytes
- Clade: Tracheophytes
- Clade: Angiosperms
- Clade: Eudicots
- Clade: Asterids
- Order: Lamiales
- Family: Lentibulariaceae
- Genus: Utricularia
- Subgenus: Utricularia subg. Utricularia
- Section: Utricularia sect. Steyermarkia
- Species: U. steyermarkii

Binomial name
- Utricularia steyermarkii P.Taylor

Species of carnivorous plant

Utricularia steyermarkii is a small, probably perennial, bryophilous lithophyte carnivorous plant that belongs to the genus Utricularia. U. steyermarkii is endemic to Venezuela and is only known from three locations: the type location in the Venezuelan state of Bolívar, one other location from Bolívar, and also from Acopán-tepuí. It grows as a terrestrial lithophyte at the base of moist mossy bluffs. It has been collected in flower or fruit in February and May. It was originally described and published by Peter Taylor in 1967. It was named in honor of Julian Alfred Steyermark.

== See also ==
- List of Utricularia species
