= Utricularia heterochroma =

Scientific classification
- Kingdom: Plantae
- Clade: Embryophytes
- Clade: Tracheophytes
- Clade: Angiosperms
- Clade: Eudicots
- Clade: Asterids
- Order: Lamiales
- Family: Lentibulariaceae
- Genus: Utricularia
- Subgenus: Utricularia subg. Utricularia
- Section: Utricularia sect. Mirabiles
- Species: U. heterochroma

Binomial name
- Utricularia heterochroma Steyerm.

Species of carnivorous plant

Utricularia heterochroma is a very small, possibly perennial, rheophytic carnivorous plant that belongs to the genus Utricularia. U. heterochroma is endemic to Venezuela, where it is known from the type location at Ptari-tepui, two collections from Toronó-tepui, one collection from Apacará-tepui, one collection from Serrania Guanay, and several collections from the Chimantá Massif. It grows as a rheophyte on wet sandstone cliffs near waterfalls among mosses at altitudes from 1,760 m (5,774 ft) to 2,450 m (8,038 ft). It was originally described and published by Julian Alfred Steyermark in 1953.

== See also ==
- List of Utricularia species
