= Utricularia cucullata =

Scientific classification
- Kingdom: Plantae
- Clade: Tracheophytes
- Clade: Angiosperms
- Clade: Eudicots
- Clade: Asterids
- Order: Lamiales
- Family: Lentibulariaceae
- Genus: Utricularia
- Subgenus: Utricularia subg. Utricularia
- Section: Utricularia sect. Vesiculina
- Species: U. cucullata

Binomial name
- Utricularia cucullata A.St.-Hil. & Girard

Synonyms
- U. ayacuchae Steyerm.; U. elephas Luetzelb.; U. malmeana Sylvén; U. palatina Weber ex Benj.; Vesiculina cucullata (A.St.-Hil. & Girard) Barnhart

Species of carnivorous plant

Utricularia cucullata is a small suspended aquatic carnivorous plant in the genus Utricularia. U. cucullata is endemic to South America and is found in Brazil, French Guiana, Guyana, Suriname, Trinidad, and Venezuela.

== See also ==
- List of Utricularia species
