= Utricularia sect. Mirabiles =

Scientific classification
- Kingdom: Plantae
- Clade: Tracheophytes
- Clade: Angiosperms
- Clade: Eudicots
- Clade: Asterids
- Order: Lamiales
- Family: Lentibulariaceae
- Genus: Utricularia
- Subgenus: Utricularia subg. Utricularia
- Section: Utricularia sect. Mirabiles; P.Taylor

Type species
- U. mirabilis P.Taylor

Species
- Utricularia heterochroma; Utricularia mirabilis

Group of carnivorous plants

Utricularia sect. Mirabiles is a section in the genus Utricularia. The two species in this section are small or medium-sized rheophytic carnivorous plants. Peter Taylor originally described and published the section in 1989, splitting the two species off from section Avesicaria on the basis of the dissimilar rhizoids, traps, corolla spur, and seeds. Both species are endemic to Venezuela.

== See also ==
- List of Utricularia species
