= Goodenia elaiosoma =

Scientific classification
- Kingdom: Plantae
- Clade: Tracheophytes
- Clade: Angiosperms
- Clade: Eudicots
- Clade: Asterids
- Order: Asterales
- Family: Goodeniaceae
- Genus: Goodenia
- Species: G. elaiosoma

Binomial name
- Goodenia elaiosoma Cowie

Species of plant

Goodenia elaiosoma is a species of flowering plant in the family Goodeniaceae and is endemic to the northern part of the Northern Territory. It is a low-lying annual herb with its new growth covered with white hairs, and has linear leaves, and racemes of purplish-brown flowers with cream to dark maroon tips.

== Description ==
Goodenia elaiosoma is a low-lying annual herb that has stems up to 70 cm (28 in) and young growth covered with white hairs. The leaves are arranged along the stems, linear, 6–35 mm (0.24–1.38 in) long and 1–2 mm (0.039–0.079 in) wide, decreasing in length towards the tip of the stems. The flowers are arranged in racemes, each flower on a pedicel 10–18 mm (0.39–0.71 in) long and with leaf-like bracts at the base. The sepals are linear, 1–1.7 mm (0.039–0.067 in) long and the corolla is purplish-brown and 5–7 mm (0.20–0.28 in) long with cream to dark maroon tips. The lower lobes of the corolla are 3.3–4 mm (0.13–0.16 in) long with wings 0.8–1.3 mm (0.031–0.051 in) wide. Flowering mainly occurs from March to May and the fruit is a more or less elliptical capsule 3–6 mm (0.12–0.24 in) long containing a seed with an elaiosome.

== Taxonomy and naming ==
Goodenia elaiosoma was first formally described in 2005 by Ian D. Cowie in the journal Austrobaileya from material he collected near Hope Inlet in 2000. The specific epithet (elaiosoma) is from Ancient Greek meaning "oil body", referring to the elasiosome on the seed.

== Distribution and habitat ==
This goodenia grows in grassland, sedgeland or low open woodland from the Finniss River near Darwin to the Kakadu National Park in the northern parts of the Northern Territory.
