= Utricularia peranomala =

Scientific classification
- Kingdom: Plantae
- Clade: Tracheophytes
- Clade: Angiosperms
- Clade: Eudicots
- Clade: Asterids
- Order: Lamiales
- Family: Lentibulariaceae
- Genus: Utricularia
- Subgenus: Utricularia subg. Utricularia
- Section: Utricularia sect. Kamienskia
- Species: U. peranomala

Binomial name
- Utricularia peranomala P.Taylor

Species of carnivorous plant

Utricularia peranomala is a very small, annual, bryophilous lithophytic carnivorous plant that belongs to the genus Utricularia. U. peranomala is endemic to China, where it is only known from the type location in the hilly northeastern part of Guangxi. It grows as a lithophyte on wet rocks in between mosses. It was originally described and published by Peter Taylor in 1986.

== See also ==
- List of Utricularia species
