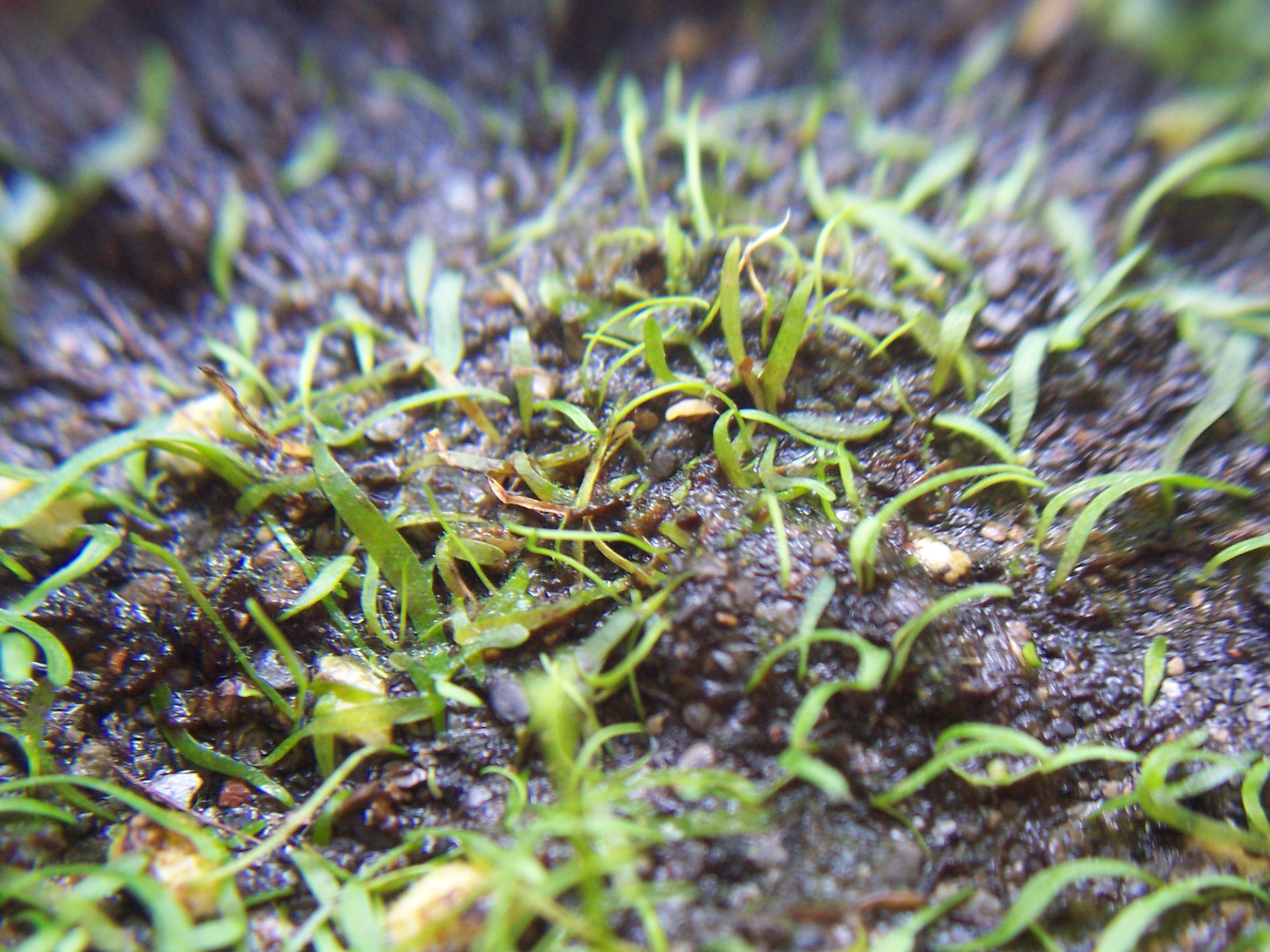

Scientific classification
- Kingdom: Plantae
- Clade: Tracheophytes
- Clade: Angiosperms
- Clade: Eudicots
- Clade: Asterids
- Order: Lamiales
- Family: Lentibulariaceae
- Genus: Utricularia
- Subgenus: Utricularia subg. Bivalvaria
- Section: Utricularia sect. Enskide
- Species: U. fulva

Binomial name
- Utricularia fulva F.Muell.

= Utricularia fulva =

Species of carnivorous plant

Utricularia fulva is a small to medium-sized annual carnivorous plant that belongs to the genus Utricularia. U. fulva is endemic to Australia, where it appears to be largely restricted to the Northern Territory, specifically the Arnhem Land sandstone escarpment. It grows as a terrestrial or subaquatic plant in or near sandy stream beds. It was originally described and published by Ferdinand von Mueller in 1858.

== See also ==
- List of Utricularia species
