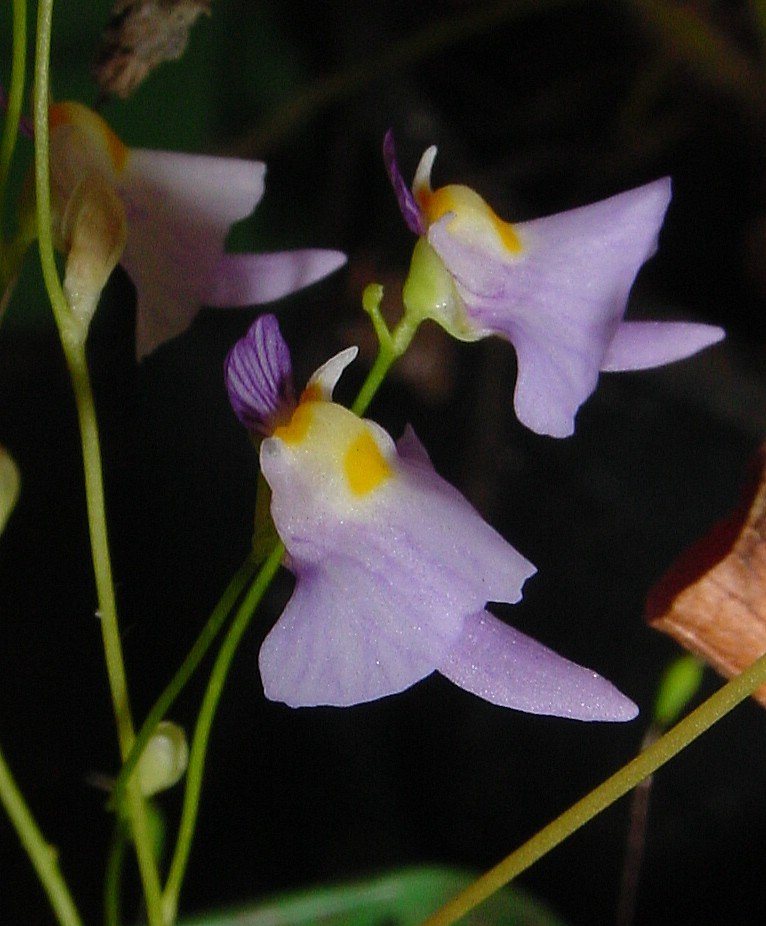
- Utricularia warburgii

Scientific classification
- Kingdom: Plantae
- Clade: Tracheophytes
- Clade: Angiosperms
- Clade: Eudicots
- Clade: Asterids
- Order: Lamiales
- Family: Lentibulariaceae
- Genus: Utricularia
- Subgenus: Utricularia subg. Bivalvaria
- Section: Utricularia sect. Nigrescentes (Oliv.) Komiya

Type species
- U. caerulea L.

Species
- Utricularia bracteata; Utricularia caerulea; Utricularia warburgii

Synonyms
- Pelidnia Barnhart; U. 'group' Nigrescentes Oliv.

= Utricularia sect. Nigrescentes =

Group of carnivorous plants

Utricularia sect. Nigrescentes is a section in the genus Utricularia. The three species in this section are small terrestrial carnivorous plants native to tropical Africa, Asia, and Australia. Daniel Oliver originally validly described and published this section in 1859, but did not specify the rank used by the group. Sadashi Komiya revised the section in 1973. Peter Taylor, in his 1989 taxonomic monograph on the genus, placed this section within subgenus Utricularia. More recent phylogenetic data and revisions have reinstated subgenus Bivalvaria and have placed this section within it.

== See also ==
- List of Utricularia species
