= Utricularia sect. Steyermarkia =

Scientific classification
- Kingdom: Plantae
- Clade: Tracheophytes
- Clade: Angiosperms
- Clade: Eudicots
- Clade: Asterids
- Order: Lamiales
- Family: Lentibulariaceae
- Genus: Utricularia
- Subgenus: Utricularia subg. Utricularia
- Section: Utricularia sect. Steyermarkia; P.Taylor

Type species
- U. aureomaculata Steyerm.

Species
- Utricularia aureomaculata; Utricularia cochleata; Utricularia steyermarkii

Synonyms
- U. sect. Setiscapella (Barnhart) P.Taylor, partly

Group of carnivorous plants

Utricularia sect. Steyermarkia is a section in the genus Utricularia. The three species in this section are small lithophyte carnivorous plants native to South America. Both U. aureomaculata and U. steyermarkii were previously included in U. sect. Setiscapella until Peter Taylor split them off from it in 1989 with the creation of section Steyermarkia. He did this on the basis of the very different seeds and multinerved leaves seen in these two species. Utricularia cochleata was described in 2008 and added to this section after these taxonomic shifts. This section is named in honor of Julian Alfred Steyermark.

== See also ==
- List of Utricularia species
