= Utricularia bracteata =

Scientific classification
- Kingdom: Plantae
- Clade: Tracheophytes
- Clade: Angiosperms
- Clade: Eudicots
- Clade: Asterids
- Order: Lamiales
- Family: Lentibulariaceae
- Genus: Utricularia
- Subgenus: Utricularia subg. Bivalvaria
- Section: Utricularia sect. Nigrescentes
- Species: U. bracteata

Binomial name
- Utricularia bracteata R.D.Good

Species of carnivorous plant

Utricularia bracteata is a medium-sized, probably perennial carnivorous plant that belongs to the genus Utricularia. U. bracteata is endemic to southern tropical Africa, where it has only been found at the type location in Angola, two other collections also in Angola, a collection in northern Zambia, and another from the Democratic Republic of the Congo. It grows as a terrestrial plant in peaty grasslands at altitudes from 1,000 m (3,281 ft) to 1,500 m (4,921 ft). It was originally described and published by Ronald D'Oyley Good in 1924.

== See also ==
- List of Utricularia species
