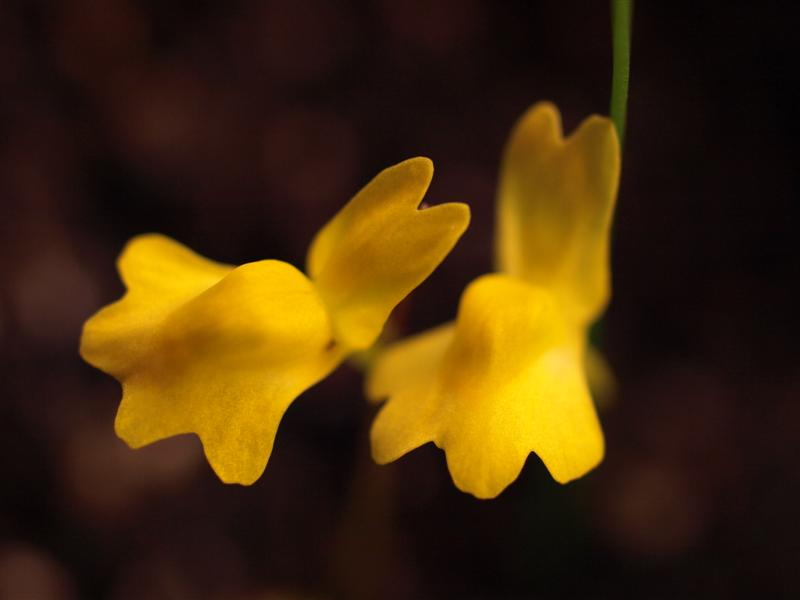

Scientific classification
- Kingdom: Plantae
- Clade: Tracheophytes
- Clade: Angiosperms
- Clade: Eudicots
- Clade: Asterids
- Order: Lamiales
- Family: Lentibulariaceae
- Genus: Utricularia
- Subgenus: Utricularia subg. Bivalvaria
- Section: Utricularia sect. Enskide
- Species: U. chrysantha

Binomial name
- Utricularia chrysantha R.Br.

Synonyms
- Enskide barbata (R.Br.) Raf.; E. chrysantha (R.Br.) Raf.; E. flava (R.Br.) Raf.; U. barbata R.Br.; U. flava R.Br.

= Utricularia chrysantha =

Species of carnivorous plant

Utricularia chrysantha, the sun bladderwort, is a medium-sized annual, terrestrial carnivorous plant that belongs to the genus Utricularia. U. chrysantha is endemic to southern New Guinea and Australia. It grows as a terrestrial species in wet grasslands or Melaleuca-Acacia savannas at low altitudes near sea level. It was originally described and published by Robert Brown in 1810.

== See also ==
- List of Utricularia species
