= Mangshan =

Mangshan (芒山, 邙山, or 莽山; literally "Mount Máng") or mangshanensis may refer to:

- Mangshan District (邙山区), a former district of Zhengzhou, Henan, China
- Mangshan Town (芒山镇), a town in Yongcheng District, Shangqiu, Henan, China, see List of township-level divisions of Henan
- Mangshan (邙山) the ancient burial ground hill in Zhongtou Village, Luoyang, Henan, China, now the site of the Luoyang Ancient Tombs Museum
- The Mangshan Mountains (莽山) in Chenzhou, Hunan, China, home to:
  - Mangshan Yao Ethnic Township (莽山瑶族乡), a township of Yao people in Yizhang County, Chenzhou
  - Mangshan National Nature Reserve (湖南莽山国家森林公园), a protected area, see List of protected areas of China
  - Citrus mangshanensis, the Mangshan mandarin, a wild citrus fruit species native to the region, morphologically similar to cultivated mandarin oranges, but of a different species
  - Protobothrops mangshanensis, a pit viper
  - Utricularia mangshanensis, a carnivorous plant
  - The Mangshan horned toad (Xenophrys mangshanensis)
  - Tremella mangensis (莽山銀耳), a fungus in the genus Tremella
  - Camellia mongshanica (莽山紅山茶), a flowering plant in the genus Camellia
