= Utricularia sect. Choristothecae =

Scientific classification
- Kingdom: Plantae
- Clade: Tracheophytes
- Clade: Angiosperms
- Clade: Eudicots
- Clade: Asterids
- Order: Lamiales
- Family: Lentibulariaceae
- Genus: Utricularia
- Subgenus: Utricularia subg. Utricularia
- Section: Utricularia sect. Choristothecae; P.Taylor

Type species
- U. choristotheca P.Taylor

Species
- Utricularia choristotheca; Utricularia determannii

Group of carnivorous plants

Utricularia sect. Choristothecae is a section in the genus Utricularia. The two species in this section are very small rheophytic carnivorous plants that were formally included in section Avesicaria but were reassigned to their own section by Peter Taylor in 1989. He had included them in section Avesicaria largely because of the similar habit of the species, but the unique pollen morphology, dissimilar internal trap glands, and the anthers led Taylor to move these two species to section Choristothecae. Both species are endemic to South America, with Utricularia determannii only known from Suriname and Utricularia choristotheca located in French Guiana and Suriname.

== See also ==
- List of Utricularia species
