= Utricularia sect. Nelipus =

Scientific classification
- Kingdom: Plantae
- Clade: Tracheophytes
- Clade: Angiosperms
- Clade: Eudicots
- Clade: Asterids
- Order: Lamiales
- Family: Lentibulariaceae
- Genus: Utricularia
- Subgenus: Utricularia subg. Utricularia
- Section: Utricularia sect. Nelipus (Raf.) P.Taylor

Species
- Utricularia biloba; Utricularia leptoplectra; Utricularia limosa

Group of carnivorous plants

Utricularia sect. Nelipus is a section in the genus Utricularia that was originally described as a genus in 1838 by Constantine Samuel Rafinesque. Two of the species in this section are endemic to Australia while the third, Utricularia limosa, is also native to Southeast Asia. Species in this section are distinguished by the characteristic two-lobed lower lip of the corolla.

== See also ==
- List of Utricularia species
