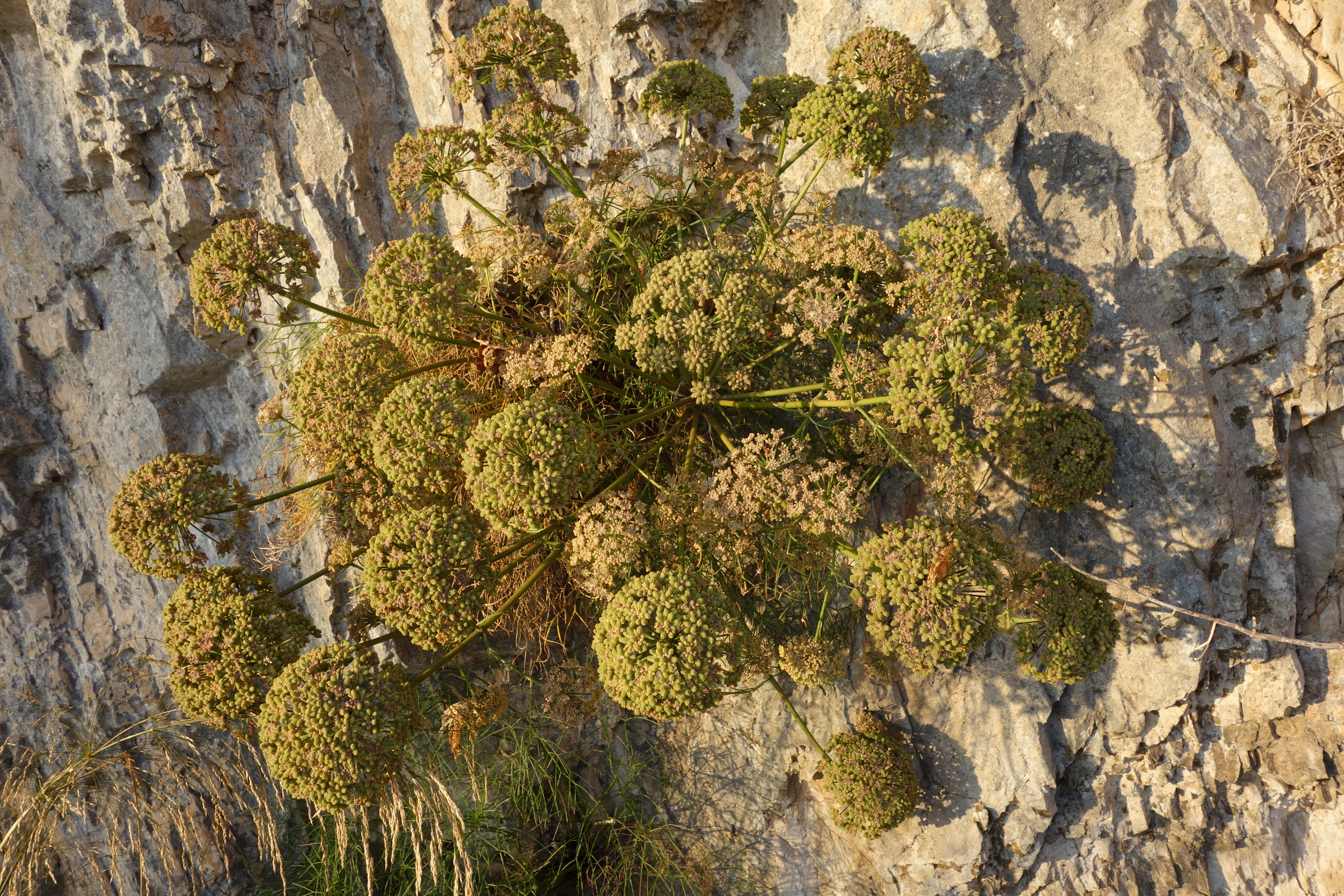
- Portenschlagiella ramosissima

Scientific classification
- Kingdom: Plantae
- Clade: Tracheophytes
- Clade: Angiosperms
- Clade: Eudicots
- Clade: Asterids
- Order: Apiales
- Family: Apiaceae
- Genus: Portenschlagiella; Tutin
- Species: P. ramosissima

Binomial name
- Portenschlagiella ramosissima (Port.) Tutin

Synonyms
- Athamanta flavescens Vis.; Athamanta ramosissima Port.; Athamanta verticillata Port.; Cuminum ramosissimum (Port.) Koso-Pol.; Portenschlagia ramosissima (Port.) Vis.; Seseli lucanum Barbaz.; Seseli ramosissimum (Port.) M.Hiroe

= Portenschlagiella =

Species of flowering plant

Portenschlagiella is a monotypic genus of flowering plants belonging to the family Apiaceae. It has one known synonym of Portenschlagia Vis. It only contains one known species, Portenschlagiella ramosissima (Port.) Tutin

Its native range is southern Italy and the western Balkan Peninsula, and it is found in Albania, Italy and Yugoslavia.

The species was first described in 1820 as Athamanta ramosissima by Franz Edler von Portenschlag-Ledermayr (1772–1822), an Austrian lawyer and botanist who collected in the Alps and the Dalmatian islands. The Latin specific epithet of ramosissima is derived from ramosissimus meaning 'with many branches'. In 1967 Thomas Gaskell Tutin placed the species in a new genus, Portenschlagiella, which he named in honour of Portenschlag. The genus and renamed species were described and published in Feddes Repert. Vol. 74 on page 32.
