= Utricularia sect. Enskide =

Scientific classification
- Kingdom: Plantae
- Clade: Tracheophytes
- Clade: Angiosperms
- Clade: Eudicots
- Clade: Asterids
- Order: Lamiales
- Family: Lentibulariaceae
- Genus: Utricularia
- Subgenus: Utricularia subg. Bivalvaria
- Section: Utricularia sect. Enskide (Raf.) P.Taylor

Type species
- U. chrysantha R.Br.

Species
- Utricularia chrysantha; Utricularia fulva

Synonyms
- Enskide Raf., as genus

Group of carnivorous plants

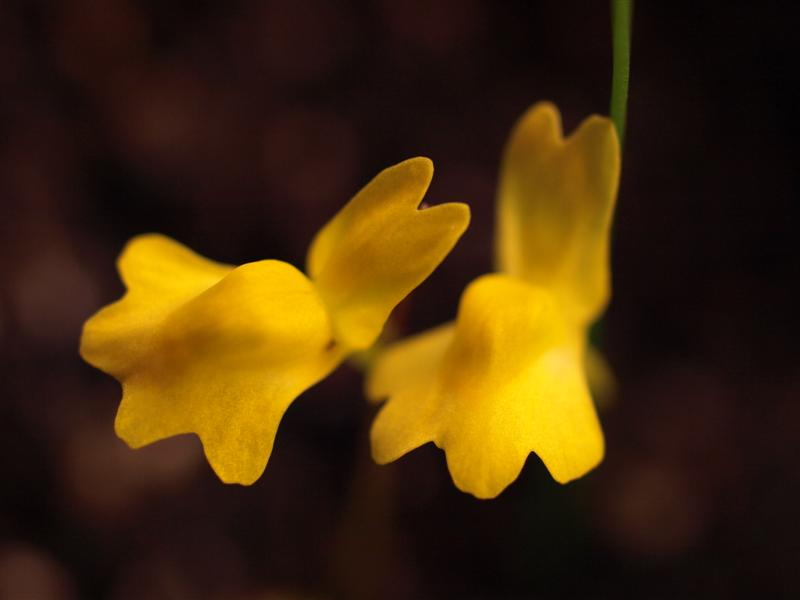
Photo of the plant

Utricularia sect. Enskide is a section in the genus Utricularia. The two species in this section are small to medium-sized terrestrial carnivorous plants native to Australia and New Guinea. Constantine Samuel Rafinesque originally described and published this section as a separate genus in his 1838 taxonomic treatment. Peter Taylor refined the section and placed it within subgenus Utricularia in his 1986 monograph of the genus. Later molecular data resulted in the revision of Taylor's treatment, reinstating subgenus Bivalvaria and placing this section within it.

== See also ==
- List of Utricularia species
