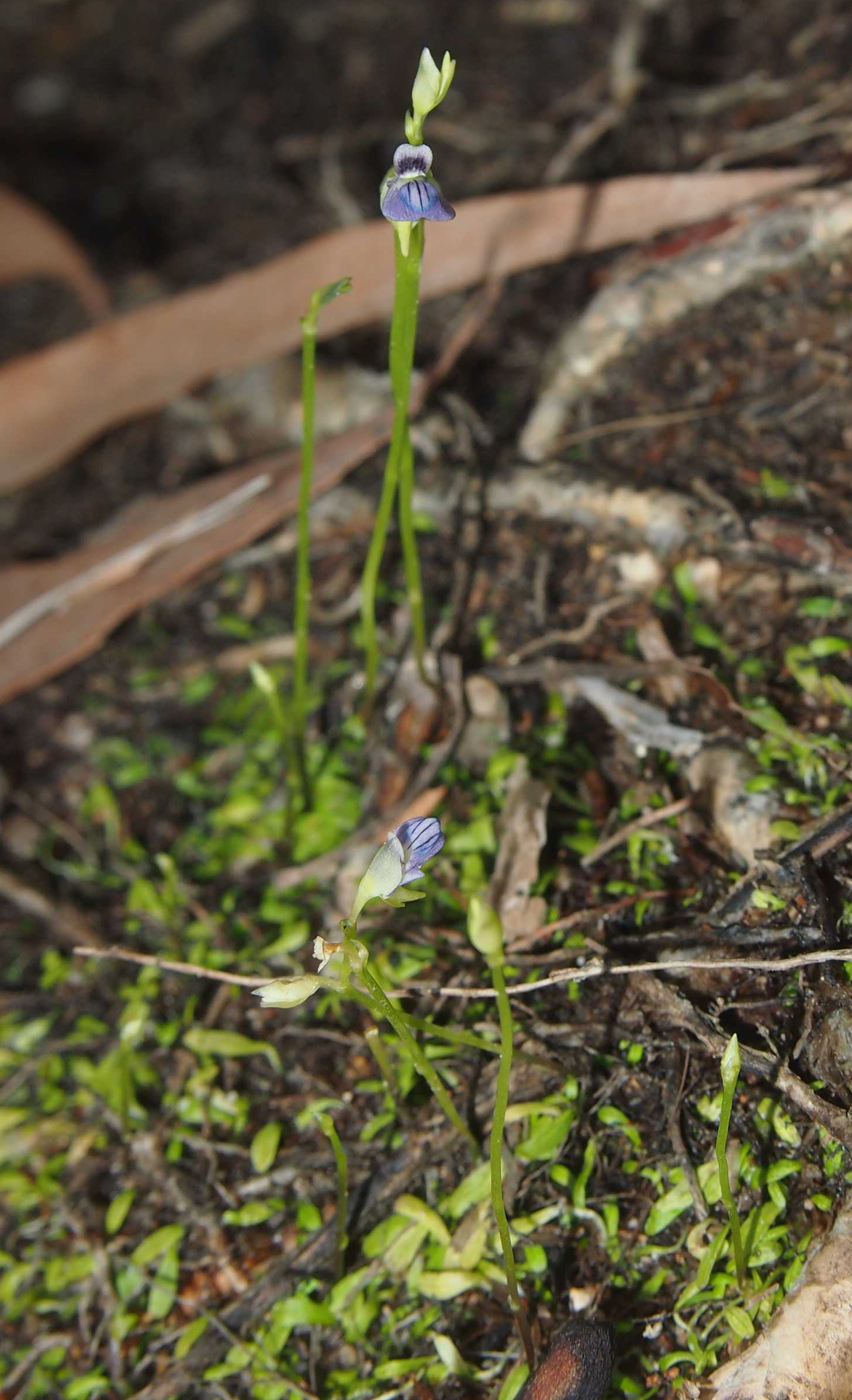

Scientific classification
- Kingdom: Plantae
- Clade: Tracheophytes
- Clade: Angiosperms
- Clade: Eudicots
- Clade: Asterids
- Order: Lamiales
- Family: Lentibulariaceae
- Genus: Utricularia
- Subgenus: Utricularia subg. Bivalvaria
- Section: Utricularia sect. Nigrescentes
- Species: U. caerulea

Binomial name
- Utricularia caerulea L.

= Utricularia caerulea =

Species of plant

Utricularia caerulea, the blue bladderwort, is a very small to medium-sized carnivorous plant that belongs to the genus Utricularia. U. caerulea spans a wide native range, including areas in tropical Africa, Asia, and Australia. It grows as a terrestrial plant in wet, shallow soils over rock, in wet grasslands, in swamps, or near streams in open communities, mostly at lower altitudes but ascending to as much as 2,100 m (6,890 ft). It was originally described and published by Carl Linnaeus in 1753.

== Synonyms ==
U. caerulea spans a wide distribution and is a very variable species, leading to a great deal of synonymy.

- Calpidisca takenakai Nakai
- Pelidnia caerulea (L.) Barnhart
- Utricularia albiflora Griff.
- U. albina Ridl.
- U. baueri Benth.
- U. bifida Macrae ex A.DC.
- U. caerulea var. filicaulis (Wall. ex A.DC.) Haines
- U. campestris Miq. ex C.B.Clarke
- U. capillaris D.Don
- U. cavalerii Stapf
- U. charnleyensis W.Fitzg.
- U. complanata Wall.
- U. filicaulis Wall.
- U. filicaulis var. papillosa Pellegr.
- U. kerrii Craib
- U. nivea Vahl
- U. nivea var. rosea (Edgew.) Trimen
- U. obscura R.Br. ex Benth.
- U. obtusiloba Benj.
- U. ophirensis Ridl.
- U. paucifolia Benj.
- U. purpurea Willd. ex Benj.
- U. racemosa Wall.
- U. racemosa var. filicaulis (Wall. ex A.DC.) C.B.Clarke
- U. racemosa var. rosea (Edgew.) Thwaites
- U. ramosa Vahl
- U. rosea Edgew.
- U. roseopurpurea Stapf ex Gamble
- U. sampathii Subr. & Yogan.
- U. sootepensis Craib
- U. squamosa Benj.

== See also ==
- List of Utricularia species
