= Utricularia mannii =

Scientific classification
- Kingdom: Plantae
- Clade: Tracheophytes
- Clade: Angiosperms
- Clade: Eudicots
- Clade: Asterids
- Order: Lamiales
- Family: Lentibulariaceae
- Genus: Utricularia
- Subgenus: Utricularia subg. Utricularia
- Section: Utricularia sect. Chelidon; P.Taylor
- Species: U. mannii

Binomial name
- Utricularia mannii Oliv.

Synonyms
- U. bryophila Ridl.

Species of carnivorous plant

Utricularia mannii is a small, perennial, epiphytic carnivorous plant that belongs to the genus Utricularia and is the only member of Utricularia sect. Chelidon. U. mannii is endemic to tropical Africa, particularly the islands in the Gulf of Guinea (Bioko, São Tomé, and Príncipe) and the adjacent mainland (Cameroon and Nigeria). It grows as an epiphytic plant on mossy tree trunks in rain forests at altitudes from 500 m (1,640 ft) to 2,100 m (6,890 ft). It has been collected in flower between April and November. It was originally published and described by Daniel Oliver in 1865 and placed in its own section, Chelidon, in 1986 by Peter Taylor.

== See also ==
- List of Utricularia species
