= Utricularia guyanensis =

Scientific classification
- Kingdom: Plantae
- Clade: Embryophytes
- Clade: Tracheophytes
- Clade: Angiosperms
- Clade: Eudicots
- Clade: Asterids
- Order: Lamiales
- Family: Lentibulariaceae
- Genus: Utricularia
- Subgenus: Utricularia subg. Utricularia
- Section: Utricularia sect. Stylotheca; A.DC.
- Species: U. guyanensis

Binomial name
- Utricularia guyanensis A.DC.

Synonyms
- U. peckii S.F.Blake; U. rubricaulis Tutin

Species of carnivorous plant

Utricularia guyanensis is a small, probably perennial, terrestrial carnivorous plant that belongs to the genus Utricularia and is the only member of Utricularia sect. Stylotheca. U. guyanensis is native to Central (Honduras and Nicaragua) and South America (Brazil, French Guiana, Guyana, Suriname, and Venezuela). It grows as a terrestrial plant on wet or damp sandy savannas at lower elevations, but up to 1,100 m (3,609 ft) in Bolívar. It has been collected in flower between January and November. It was originally published and described by Alphonse Pyrame de Candolle in 1844 and placed in its own section, Stylotheca.

== See also ==
- List of Utricularia species
