= Utricularia podadena =

Scientific classification
- Kingdom: Plantae
- Clade: Tracheophytes
- Clade: Angiosperms
- Clade: Eudicots
- Clade: Asterids
- Order: Lamiales
- Family: Lentibulariaceae
- Genus: Utricularia
- Subgenus: Utricularia subg. Utricularia
- Section: Utricularia sect. Candollea; P.Taylor
- Species: U. podadena

Binomial name
- Utricularia podadena P.Taylor

Species of carnivorous plant

Utricularia podadena is a small, probably perennial, terrestrial carnivorous plant that belongs to the genus Utricularia and is the only member of Utricularia sect. Candollea. U. podadena is endemic to Malawi and Mozambique, being known only from the type location in Malawi and from one other collection in Mozambique. As of Peter Taylor's 1989 monograph on the genus, more recent efforts to locate this species have failed. It was originally published and described by Taylor in 1964 and placed in its own section, Candollea, in 1986. It grows as a terrestrial plant in marshy grasslands in the presence of Loudetia species at altitudes of around 1,000 m (3,281 ft). It flowers in July. It is a very distinct plant in the genus with the long stipitate glandular trichomes covering the flower. Its affinities within the genus are not clear.

== See also ==
- List of Utricularia species
