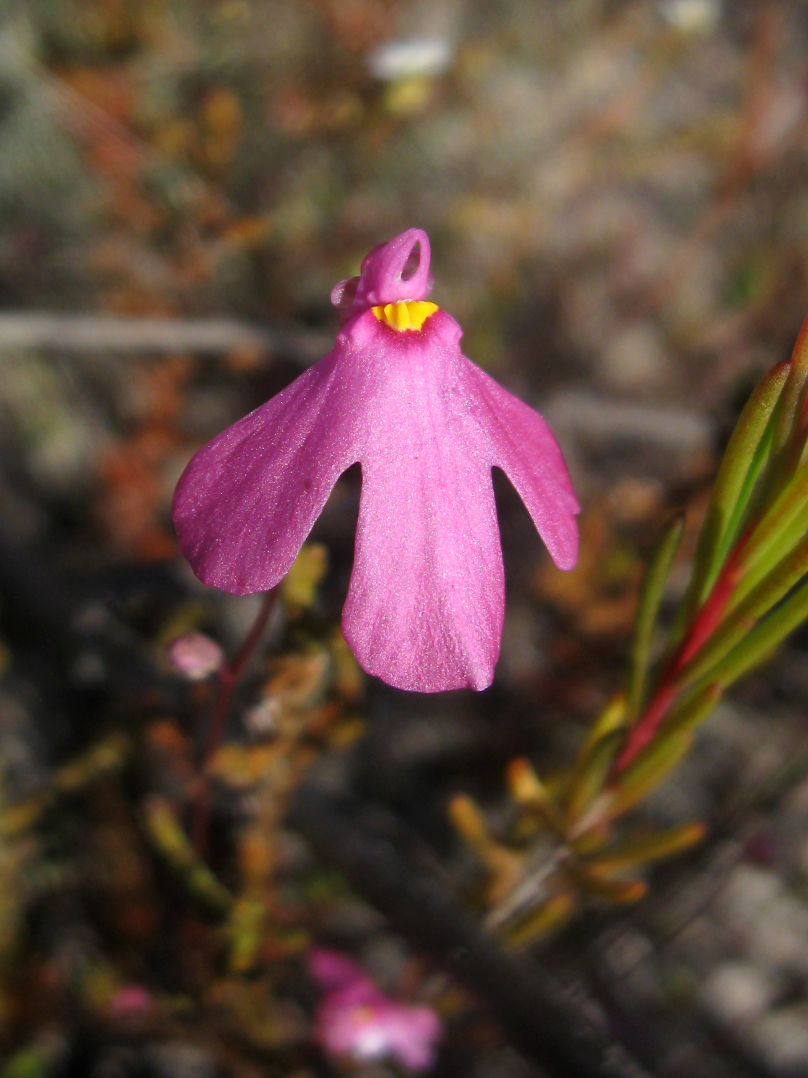

Scientific classification
- Kingdom: Plantae
- Clade: Tracheophytes
- Clade: Angiosperms
- Clade: Eudicots
- Clade: Asterids
- Order: Lamiales
- Family: Lentibulariaceae
- Genus: Utricularia
- Subgenus: Utricularia subg. Polypompholyx
- Section: Utricularia sect. Polypompholyx (Lehm.) P.Taylor

Species
- Utricularia multifida Utricularia tenella

= Utricularia sect. Polypompholyx =

Group of carnivorous plants

Utricularia sect. Polypompholyx is a section in the genus Utricularia that was considered to be its own genus in the family Lentibulariaceae but was reduced to sectional rank by Peter Taylor.

== See also ==
- List of Utricularia species
