= Utricularia appendiculata =

Conservation status
- Least Concern (IUCN 3.1)

Scientific classification
- Kingdom: Plantae
- Clade: Tracheophytes
- Clade: Angiosperms
- Clade: Eudicots
- Clade: Asterids
- Order: Lamiales
- Family: Lentibulariaceae
- Genus: Utricularia
- Subgenus: Utricularia subg. Utricularia
- Section: Utricularia sect. Oliveria; P.Taylor
- Species: X. appendiculata

Binomial name
- Xylopia appendiculata E.A.Bruce

Synonyms
- [U. tortilis De Wild.]

Species of carnivorous plant

Utricularia appendiculata is a medium-sized, probably perennial, terrestrial carnivorous plant that belongs to the genus Utricularia and is the only member of Utricularia sect. Oliveria. U. appendiculata is endemic to Africa, where it can be found in Burundi, Cameroon, the Central African Republic, the Democratic Republic of the Congo, Gabon, Madagascar, Malawi, Mozambique, Tanzania, Uganda, and Zimbabwe. It grows as a terrestrial plant in wet Sphagnum bogs, damp sandy savannas, or in peaty marshes at altitudes from 1,500 m (4,921 ft) to 1,860 m (6,102 ft), but as low as 700 m (2,297 ft) in the Central African Republic. It flowers mostly in the wet season. It was originally published and described by Eileen Adelaide Bruce in 1933 and was placed in its own section, Oliveria, in 1986 by Peter Taylor.

== See also ==
- List of Utricularia species
