= Utricularia westonii =

Scientific classification
- Kingdom: Plantae
- Clade: Tracheophytes
- Clade: Angiosperms
- Clade: Eudicots
- Clade: Asterids
- Order: Lamiales
- Family: Lentibulariaceae
- Genus: Utricularia
- Subgenus: Utricularia subg. Polypompholyx
- Section: Utricularia sect. Tridentaria
- Species: U. westonii

Binomial name
- Utricularia westonii P.Taylor 1986

Species of carnivorous plant

Utricularia westonii is a terrestrial carnivorous plant that belongs to the genus Utricularia (family Lentibulariaceae). It is named for Dr. A. Weston who first discovered this species in 1971. It is endemic to Cape Le Grand National Park in Western Australia. It is the only member of section Tridentaria.

== See also ==
- List of Utricularia species
