= Utricularia sect. Meionula =

Scientific classification
- Kingdom: Plantae
- Clade: Tracheophytes
- Clade: Angiosperms
- Clade: Eudicots
- Clade: Asterids
- Order: Lamiales
- Family: Lentibulariaceae
- Genus: Utricularia
- Subgenus: Utricularia subg. Utricularia
- Section: Utricularia sect. Meionula (Raf.) P.Taylor

Type species
- U. minutissima Vahl

Species
- Utricularia geoffrayi; Utricularia hirta; Utricularia minutissima

Synonyms
- Meionula Raf.; Trixapias Raf.

Group of carnivorous plants

Utricularia sect. Meionula is a section in the genus Utricularia. The four species in this section are small terrestrial carnivorous plants native to Southeast Asia and Australia. Constantine Samuel Rafinesque originally published some of the species in this section under two genera, Meionula and Trixapias, in 1838. Peter Taylor published the section as it currently stands in 1986, including three additional Australian and New Zealand species which are now circumscribed in their own section, Australes.

== See also ==
- List of Utricularia species
