= Utricularia viscosa =

Scientific classification
- Kingdom: Plantae
- Clade: Tracheophytes
- Clade: Angiosperms
- Clade: Eudicots
- Clade: Asterids
- Order: Lamiales
- Family: Lentibulariaceae
- Genus: Utricularia
- Subgenus: Utricularia subg. Utricularia
- Section: Utricularia sect. Sprucea; P.Taylor
- Species: U. viscosa

Binomial name
- Utricularia viscosa Spruce ex Oliv.

Synonyms
- U. adenantha Standl.; U. cutleri Steyerm.

Species of carnivorous plant

Utricularia viscosa is a small to medium-sized perennial, terrestrial or subaquatic carnivorous plant that belongs to the genus Utricularia and is the only member of Utricularia sect. Sprucea. U. viscosa is native to Central America (Belize and Nicaragua) and South America (Brazil, French Guiana, Guyana, Suriname, Trinidad, and Venezuela). It grows as a terrestrial or subaquatic plant in wet sandy savannas at lower altitudes but as high as 900 m (2,953 ft) in Guyana. It was originally named by Richard Spruce and formally described by Daniel Oliver in 1860. In 1986, Peter Taylor placed this species in its own section, Sprucea, which was named in honor of Richard Spruce.

== See also ==
- List of Utricularia species
