= Utricularia sect. Kamienskia =

Scientific classification
- Kingdom: Plantae
- Clade: Tracheophytes
- Clade: Angiosperms
- Clade: Eudicots
- Clade: Asterids
- Order: Lamiales
- Family: Lentibulariaceae
- Genus: Utricularia
- Subgenus: Utricularia subg. Utricularia
- Section: Utricularia sect. Kamienskia; P.Taylor

Type species
- U. peranomala P.Taylor

Species
- Utricularia mangshanensis; Utricularia peranomala

Group of carnivorous plants

Utricularia sect. Kamienskia is a section in the genus Utricularia. The two species in this section are very small bryophilous lithophytic carnivorous plants. Peter Taylor originally described and published the section and its single species, Utricularia peranomala, in 1986. In 2007, Guang Wan Hu described Utricularia mangshanensis and placed it in this section. Both species are endemic to China.

== See also ==
- List of Utricularia species
