= Utricularia tenuissima =

Scientific classification
- Kingdom: Plantae
- Clade: Embryophytes
- Clade: Tracheophytes
- Clade: Angiosperms
- Clade: Eudicots
- Clade: Asterids
- Order: Lamiales
- Family: Lentibulariaceae
- Genus: Utricularia
- Subgenus: Utricularia subg. Utricularia
- Section: Utricularia sect. Martinia; P.Taylor
- Species: U. tenuissima

Binomial name
- Utricularia tenuissima Tutin

Species of carnivorous plant

Utricularia tenuissima is a small, annual, terrestrial carnivorous plant that belongs to the genus Utricularia and is the only member of Utricularia sect. Martinia. U. tenuissima is endemic to South America, where it can be found in Brazil, Colombia, Guyana, Suriname, Trinidad, and Venezuela. It grows as a terrestrial plant in wet, open savanna usually in sand at altitudes from sea level to 2,100 m (6,890 ft). It was originally published and described by Thomas Gaskell Tutin in 1934 and placed in its own section, Martinia, in 1986 by Peter Taylor.

== See also ==
- List of Utricularia species
