= Utricularia sect. Vesiculina =

Scientific classification
- Kingdom: Plantae
- Clade: Tracheophytes
- Clade: Angiosperms
- Clade: Eudicots
- Clade: Asterids
- Order: Lamiales
- Family: Lentibulariaceae
- Genus: Utricularia
- Subgenus: Utricularia subg. Utricularia
- Section: Utricularia sect. Vesiculina (Raf.) P.Taylor

Type species
- U. purpurea Walter

Species
- Utricularia cucullata; Utricularia myriocista; Utricularia purpurea

Synonyms
- Utricularia subg. Vesiculina (Raf.) Komiya; Vesiculina Raf.; Vesiculina subg. Hydrion Barnhart; Vesiculina subg. Pemphigina Barnhart

Group of carnivorous plants

Utricularia sect. Vesiculina is a section in the genus Utricularia. The species in this section are small or medium-sized suspended aquatic carnivorous plants native to North and South America.

== See also ==
- List of Utricularia species
