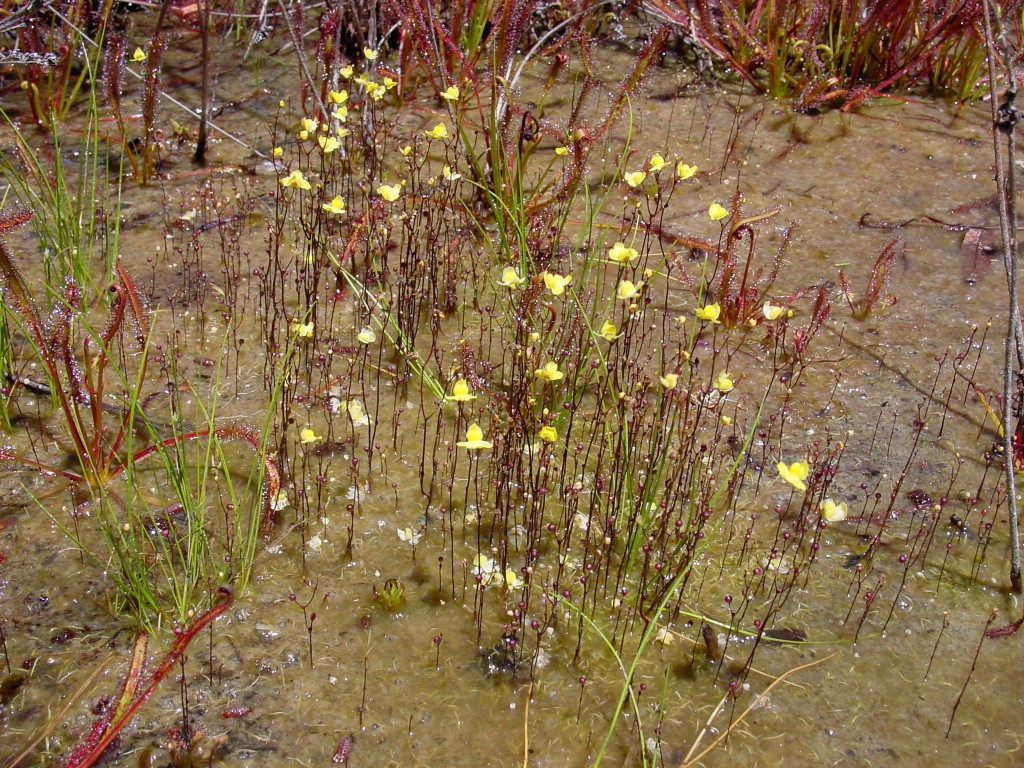
- Utricularia subulata, a species in section Setiscapella

Scientific classification
- Kingdom: Plantae
- Clade: Tracheophytes
- Clade: Angiosperms
- Clade: Eudicots
- Clade: Asterids
- Order: Lamiales
- Family: Lentibulariaceae
- Genus: Utricularia
- Subgenus: Utricularia subg. Utricularia
- Section: Utricularia sect. Setiscapella (Barnhart) P.Taylor

Species
- Utricularia flaccida Utricularia nervosa Utricularia nigrescens Utricularia physoceras Utricularia pusilla Utricularia stanfieldii Utricularia subulata Utricularia trichophylla Utricularia triloba

Synonyms
- Setiscapella Barnhart; U. subg. Setiscapella (Barnhart) Komiya

= Utricularia sect. Setiscapella =

Taxon of plants

Utricularia sect. Setiscapella is a section in the genus Utricularia that contains small or medium-sized terrestrial or subaquatic species. Most plants in this section are endemic to Central and South America with the exceptions of Utricularia stanfieldii, which is endemic to Africa, and Utricularia subulata which is almost pantropical. It was first described by John Hendley Barnhart in 1916 at the rank of genus. In 1973, Sadashi Komiya reduced the genus to a subgenus of the genus Utricularia. In his 1986 monograph on the genus, Peter Taylor reorganized the genus and reduced this to the rank of section.

== See also ==
- List of Utricularia species
