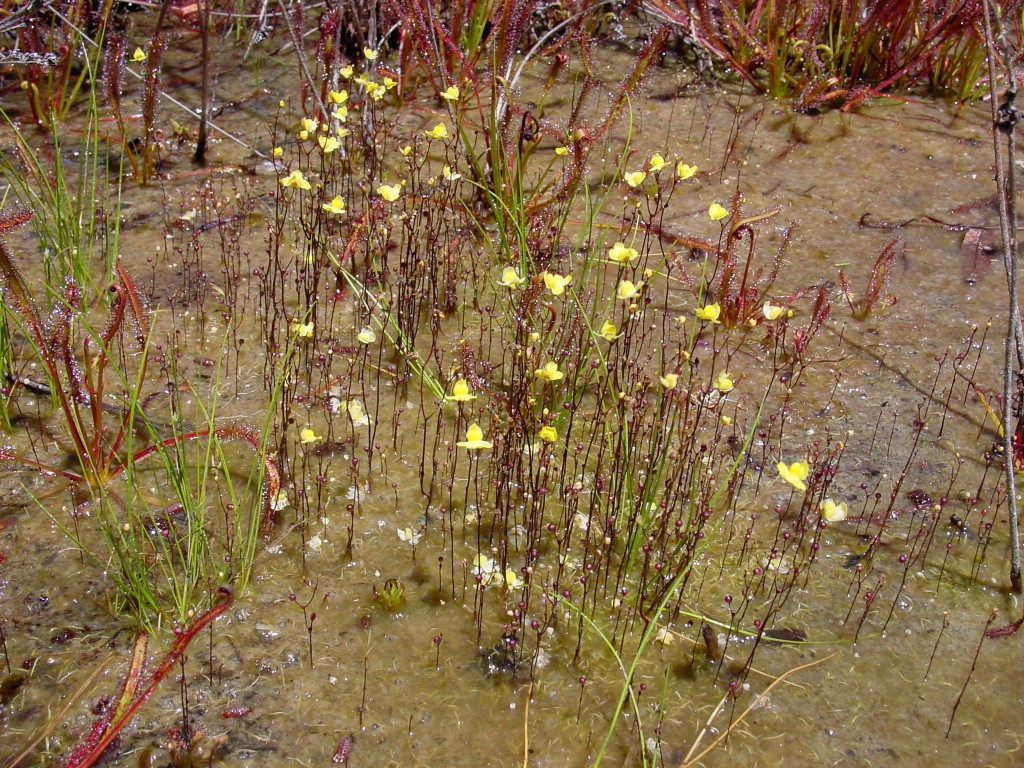

Scientific classification
- Kingdom: Plantae
- Clade: Tracheophytes
- Clade: Angiosperms
- Clade: Eudicots
- Clade: Asterids
- Order: Lamiales
- Family: Lentibulariaceae
- Genus: Utricularia
- Subgenus: Utricularia subg. Utricularia
- Section: Utricularia sect. Avesicaria; Kamiénski

Species
- Utricularia neottioides; Utricularia oliveriana

Synonyms
- Avesicaria (Kamiénski) Barnhart; U. sect. Neottioides Luetzelb.; U. subg. Avesicaria (Kamiénski) Komiya

= Utricularia sect. Avesicaria =

Group of carnivorous plants

Utricularia sect. Avesicaria is a section in the genus Utricularia. Both species in this section are endemic to Central and South America.

== See also ==
- List of Utricularia species
