= Ian D. Cowie =

Australian botanist

Ian Donald Cowie (born 1956) is an Australian botanist, who works at the Northern Territory Herbarium, as Chief Botanist.

== See also ==
Taxa named by Ian D. Cowie
