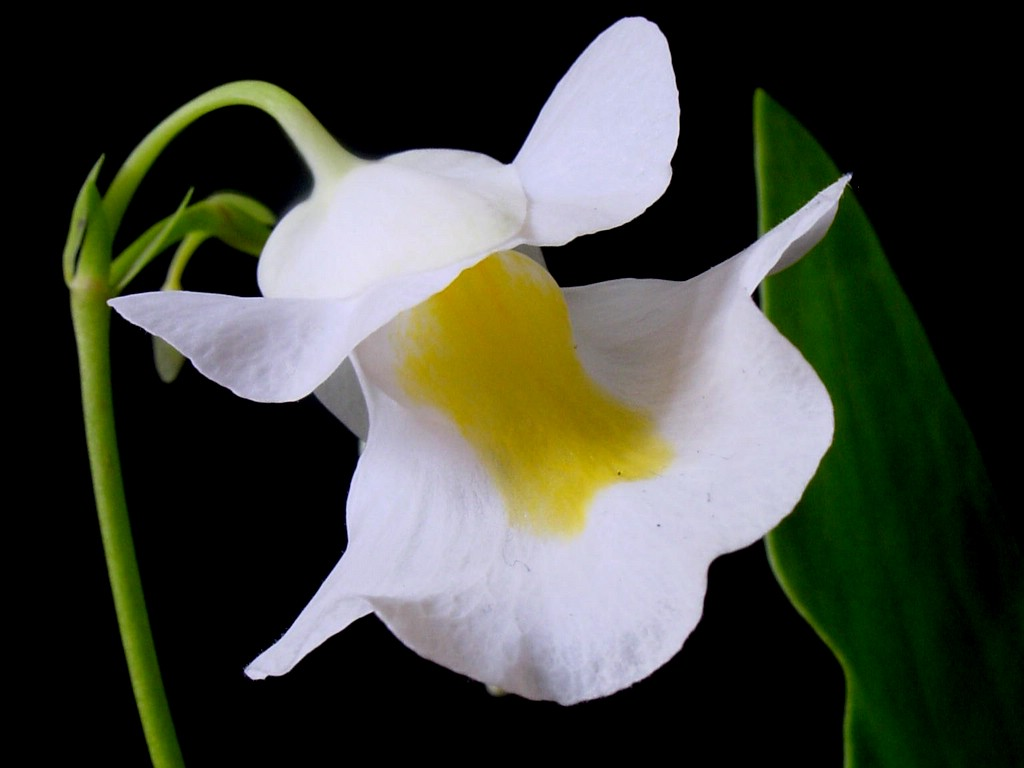
- Utricularia alpina, a species in subgenus Utricularia, section Orchidioides.

Scientific classification
- Kingdom: Plantae
- Clade: Tracheophytes
- Clade: Angiosperms
- Clade: Eudicots
- Clade: Asterids
- Order: Lamiales
- Family: Lentibulariaceae
- Genus: Utricularia
- Subgenus: Utricularia subg. Utricularia

Sections
- Avesicaria; Candollea; Chelidon; Choristothecae; Foliosa; Kamienskia; Lecticula; Martinia; Meionula; Mirabiles; Nelipus; Oliveria; Orchidioides; Setiscapella; Sprucea; Steyermarkia; Stylotheca; Utricularia; Vesiculina

= Utricularia subg. Utricularia =

Subgenus of carnivorous plants

Utricularia subg. Utricularia is a subgenus in the genus Utricularia.

== See also ==
- List of Utricularia species
