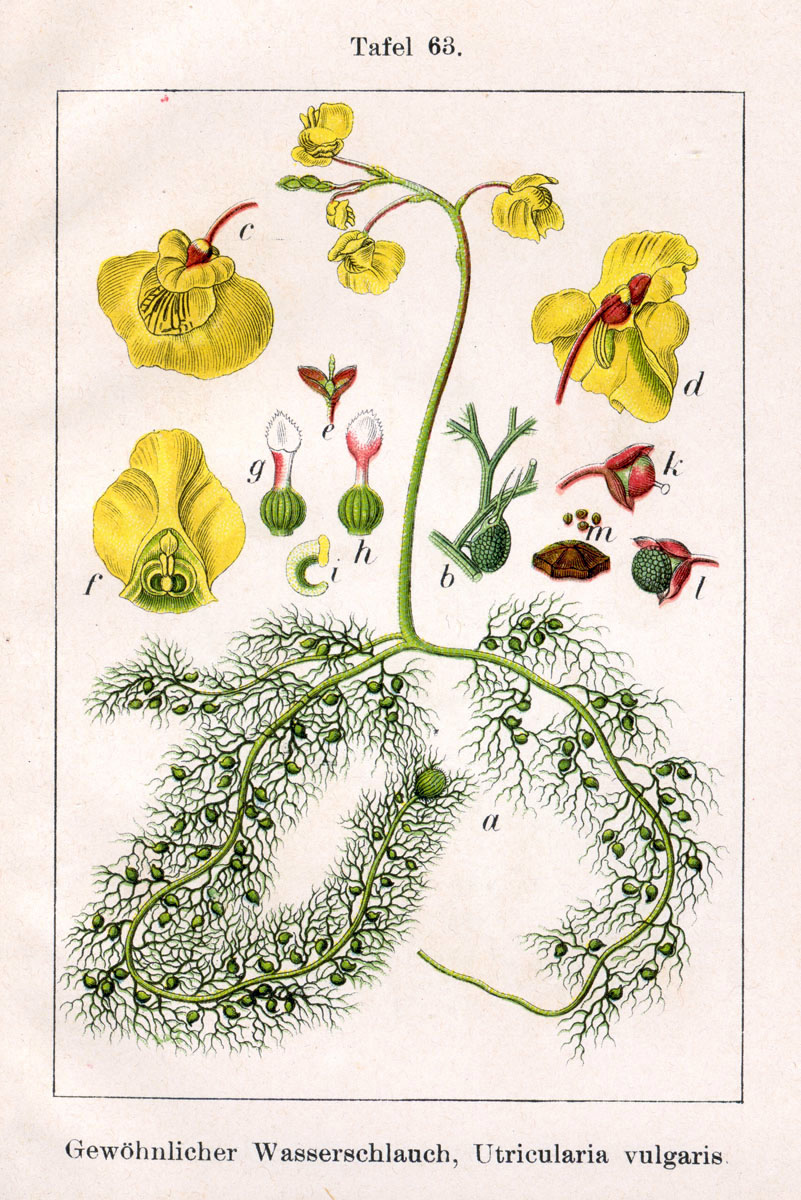
- Utricularia vulgaris illustration from Jakob Sturm's "Deutschlands Flora in Abbildungen", Stuttgart (1796)

Scientific classification
- Kingdom: Plantae
- Clade: Tracheophytes
- Clade: Angiosperms
- Clade: Eudicots
- Clade: Asterids
- Order: Lamiales
- Family: Lentibulariaceae
- Genus: Utricularia; L.

Subgenera
- Bivalvaria; Polypompholyx; Utricularia

Diversity
- 233 species
- Bladderwort distribution

= Utricularia =

Genus of carnivorous plants

Utricularia, commonly and collectively called the bladderworts, is a genus of carnivorous plants consisting of approximately 233 species (precise counts differ based on classification opinions; a 2001 publication lists 215 species). They occur in freshwater and wet soil as terrestrial or aquatic species across every continent except Antarctica. Utricularia are cultivated for their flowers, which are often compared with those of snapdragons and orchids, especially amongst carnivorous plant enthusiasts.

All Utricularia are carnivorous and capture small organisms by means of bladder-like traps. Terrestrial species tend to have tiny traps that feed on minute prey such as protozoa and rotifers swimming in water-saturated soil. The traps can range in size from 0.02 to 1.2 cm (0.008 to 0.5 in). Aquatic species, such as U. vulgaris (common bladderwort), possess bladders that are usually larger and can feed on more substantial prey such as water fleas (Daphnia), nematodes and even fish fry, mosquito larvae and young tadpoles. Despite their small size, the traps are extremely sophisticated. In the active traps of the aquatic species, prey brush against trigger hairs connected to the trapdoor. The bladder, when "set", is under negative pressure in relation to its environment so that when the trapdoor is mechanically triggered, the prey, along with the water surrounding it, is sucked into the bladder. Once the bladder is full of water, the door closes again, the whole process taking only ten to fifteen milliseconds.

Bladderworts are unusual and highly specialized plants, and the vegetative organs are not clearly separated into roots, leaves, and stems as in most other angiosperms. Utricularia lack a root system. Bladder traps are recognized as one of the most sophisticated structures in the plant kingdom.

== Description ==
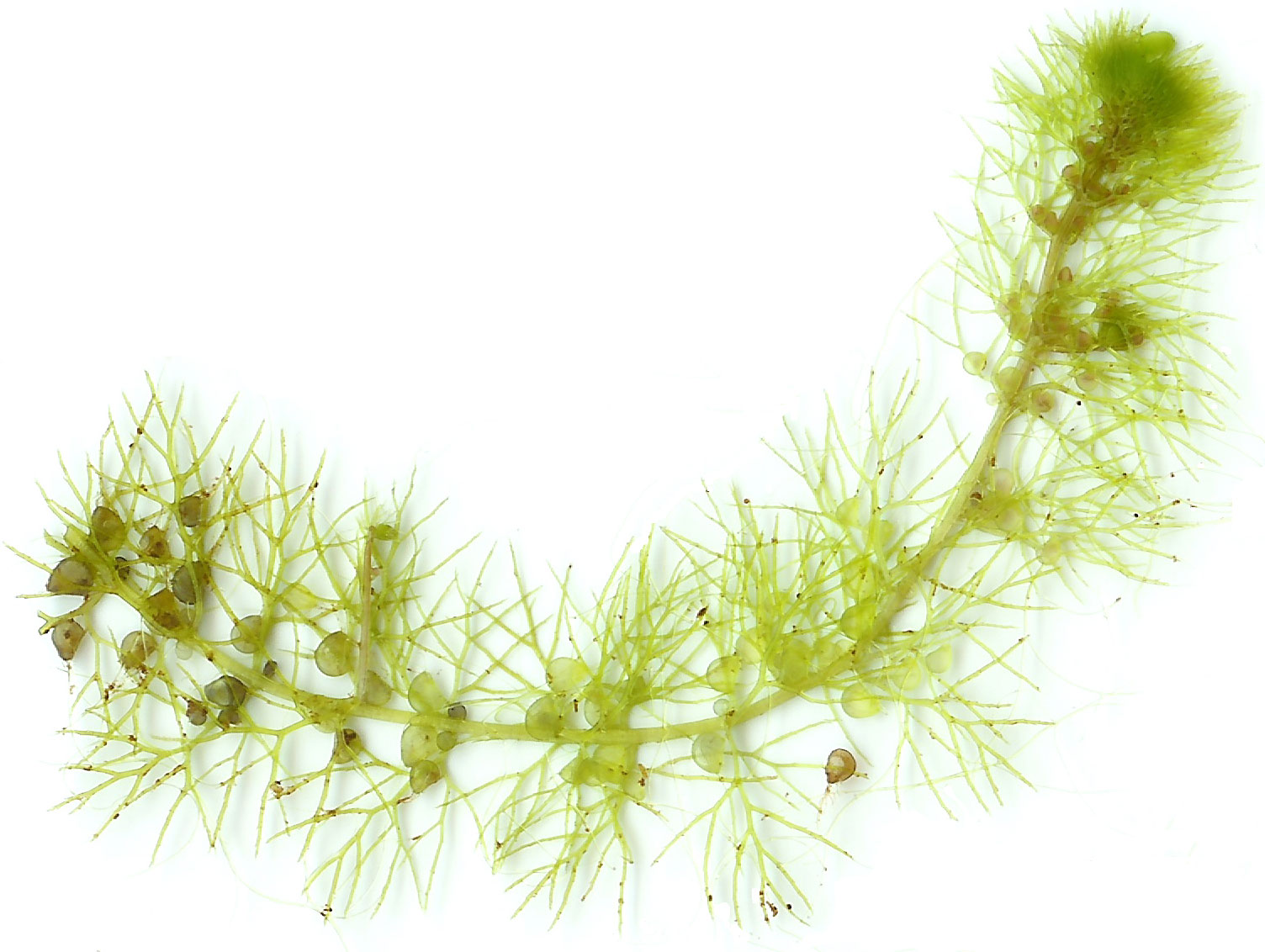
The tip of one stolon from a U.K. instance of U. vulgaris, showing stolon, branching leaf-shoots and transparent bladder traps

The main part of a bladderwort plant always lies beneath the surface of its substrate. Terrestrial species sometimes produce a few photosynthetic leaf-shoots. The aquatic species can be observed below the surfaces of ponds and streams.

=== Plant structure ===
Most species form long, thin, sometimes branching stems or stolons beneath the surface of their substrate, whether that be pond water or dripping moss in the canopy of a tropical rainforest. To these stolons are attached both the bladder traps and photosynthetic leaf-shoots, and in terrestrial species the shoots are thrust upward through the soil into the air or along the surface.

The name bladderwort refers to the bladder-like traps. The aquatic members of the genus have the largest and most obvious bladders, and these were initially thought to be flotation devices before their carnivorous nature was discovered.

=== Etymology ===
The generic name Utricularia is derived from the Latin utriculus, a word which has many related meanings but which most commonly means wine flask, leather bottle or bagpipe.

=== Flowers ===
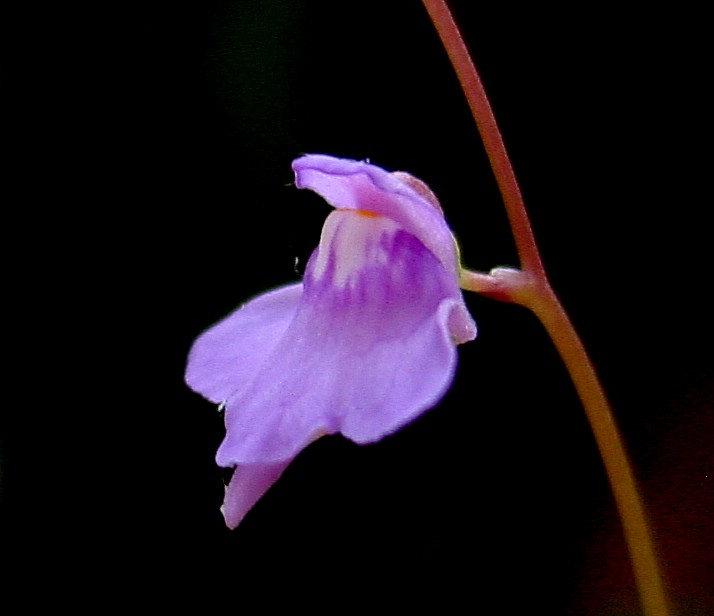
Utricularia amethystina flower

Flowers are the only part of the plant clear of the underlying soil or water. They are usually produced at the end of thin, often vertical inflorescences. They can range in size from 0.2 to 10 cm (0.08 to 4 in) wide, and have two asymmetric labiate (unequal, lip-like) petals, the lower usually significantly larger than the upper. They can be of any colour, or of many colours, and are similar in structure to the flowers of a related carnivorous genus, Pinguicula.

The flowers of aquatic varieties like U. vulgaris are often described as similar to small yellow snapdragons, and the Australian species U. dichotoma can produce the effect of a field full of violets on nodding stems. The epiphytic species of South America, however, are generally considered to have the showiest, as well as the largest, flowers. It is these species that are frequently compared with orchids.

Certain plants in particular seasons might produce closed, self-pollinating (cleistogamous) flowers; but the same plant or species might produce open, insect-pollinated flowers elsewhere or at a different time of year, and with no obvious pattern. Sometimes, individual plants have both types of flower at the same time: aquatic species such as U. dimorphantha and U. geminiscapa, for example, usually have open flowers riding clear of the water and one or more closed, self-pollinating flowers beneath the water. Seeds are numerous and small and for the majority of species are 0.2 to 1 mm (0.008 to 0.04 in) long.

== Distribution and habitat ==
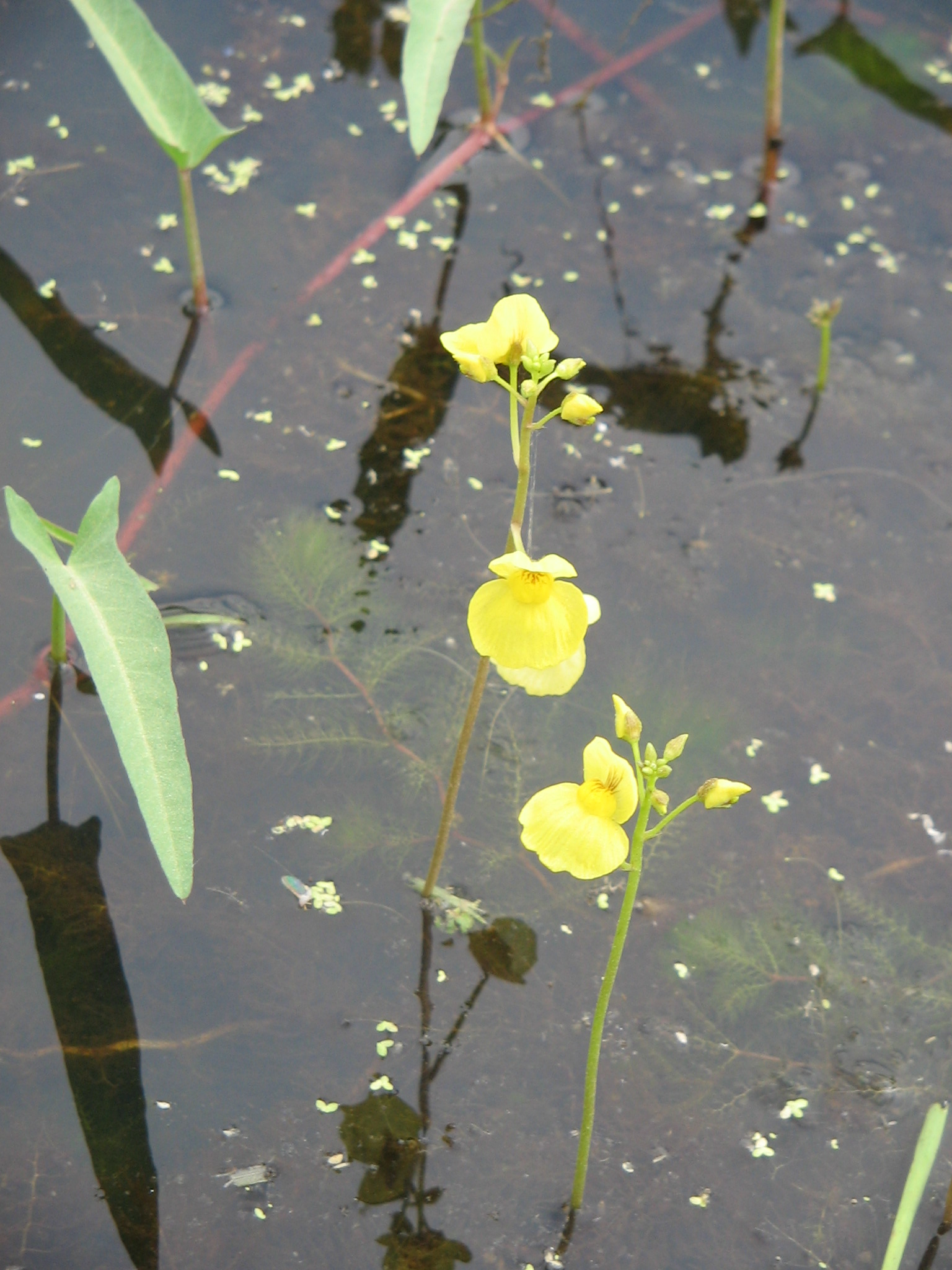
Utricularia aurea growing in a rice paddy in Thailand.

Utricularia can survive almost anywhere where there is fresh water for at least part of the year; only Antarctica and some oceanic islands have no native species. The greatest species diversity for the genus is seen in South America, with Australia coming a close second. In common with most carnivorous plants, they grow in moist soils which are poor in dissolved minerals, where their carnivorous nature gives them a competitive advantage; terrestrial varieties of Utricularia can frequently be found alongside representatives of the carnivorous genera–Sarracenia, Drosera and others–in very wet areas where continuously moving water removes most soluble minerals from the soil.

Utricularia has a variety of life forms, including terrestrial, lithophytic, aquatic, epiphytic, and rheophytic forms which are all highly adapted for their environments.

About 80% of the species are terrestrial, and most inhabit waterlogged or wet soils, where their tiny bladders can be permanently exposed to water in the substrate. Frequently they will be found in marshy areas where the water table is very close to the surface. Most of the terrestrial species are tropical, although they occur worldwide.

Approximately 20% of the species are aquatic. Most of these drift freely over the surface of ponds and other still, muddy-bottomed waters and only protrude above the surface when flowering, although a few species are lithophytic and adapted to rapidly moving streams or even waterfalls. The plants are usually found in acidic waters, but they are quite capable of growing in alkaline waters and would very likely do so were it not for the higher level of competition from other plants in such areas. Aquatic Utricularia are often split into two categories: suspended and affixed aquatic. Suspended aquatics are species which are not rooted into the ground and are free-floating, often found in nutrient poor sites. Conversely, fixed aquatics are species which have at least some of their shoots rooted into the ground. These plants often have dimorphic shoots, some which are leafy, green, and often bladderless which float in the water, and others which are white and coated with bladders that affix the plant to the ground. Utricularia vulgaris is an aquatic species and grows into branching rafts with individual stolons up to one metre or longer in ponds and ditches throughout Eurasia.

Some South American tropical species are epiphytes, and can be found growing in wet moss and spongy bark on trees in rainforests, or even in the watery leaf-rosettes of other epiphytes such as various Tillandsia (a type of bromeliad) species. Epiphytic Utricularia are often known for their orchid-like flowers and are the most ornamentally sought after. Rosette-forming epiphytes such as U. nelumbifolia put out runners, searching for other nearby bromeliads to colonise.

There are also a few lithophytic species which live on wet surfaces of cliffs and mossy rocks and rheophytic species which live in shallow rivers and streams.

The plants are as highly adapted in their methods of surviving seasonally inclement conditions as they are in their structure and feeding habits. Temperate perennials can require a winter period in which they die back each year, and they will weaken in cultivation if they are not given it; tropical and warm-temperate species, on the other hand, require no dormancy. Floating bladderworts in cold temperate zones such as the UK and Siberia can produce winter buds called turions at the extremities of their stems: as the autumnal light fails and growth slows down, the main plant may rot away or be killed by freezing conditions, but the turions will separate and sink to the bottom of the pond to rest beneath the coming ice until the spring, when they will return to the surface and resume growth. Many Australian species will grow only during the wet season, reducing themselves to tubers only 10 mm (0.4 in) long to wait out the dry season. Other species are annual, returning from seed each year.

=== Dispersal and life form evolution ===
The ancestral line of Utricularia is thought to have been terrestrial. From terrestrial forms, epiphytic forms evolved independently three times and aquatic life forms arose four times in genus Utricularia.

Biogeographic patterns associated with the boreotropic hypothesis lists the origin of Lentibulariaceae to temperate Eurasia or tropical America. Based on fossilised pollen and insular separation, the last common ancestor of Genlisea–Utricularia clade was found to be a South American lineage that arose 39 mya. Utricularia probably diverged from its sister genus 30 mya and subsequently dispersed to Australia, represented by subgenus Polypompholyx, and to Africa. There were most likely other transcontinental dispersals, one of which is represented by sect. Nelipus. The colonization of Utricularia to North America probably occurred 12 mya from South America. The dispersal of Utricularia to Eurasia probably occurred through the Bering Strait via long-distance dispersal 4.7 mya.

== Carnivory ==
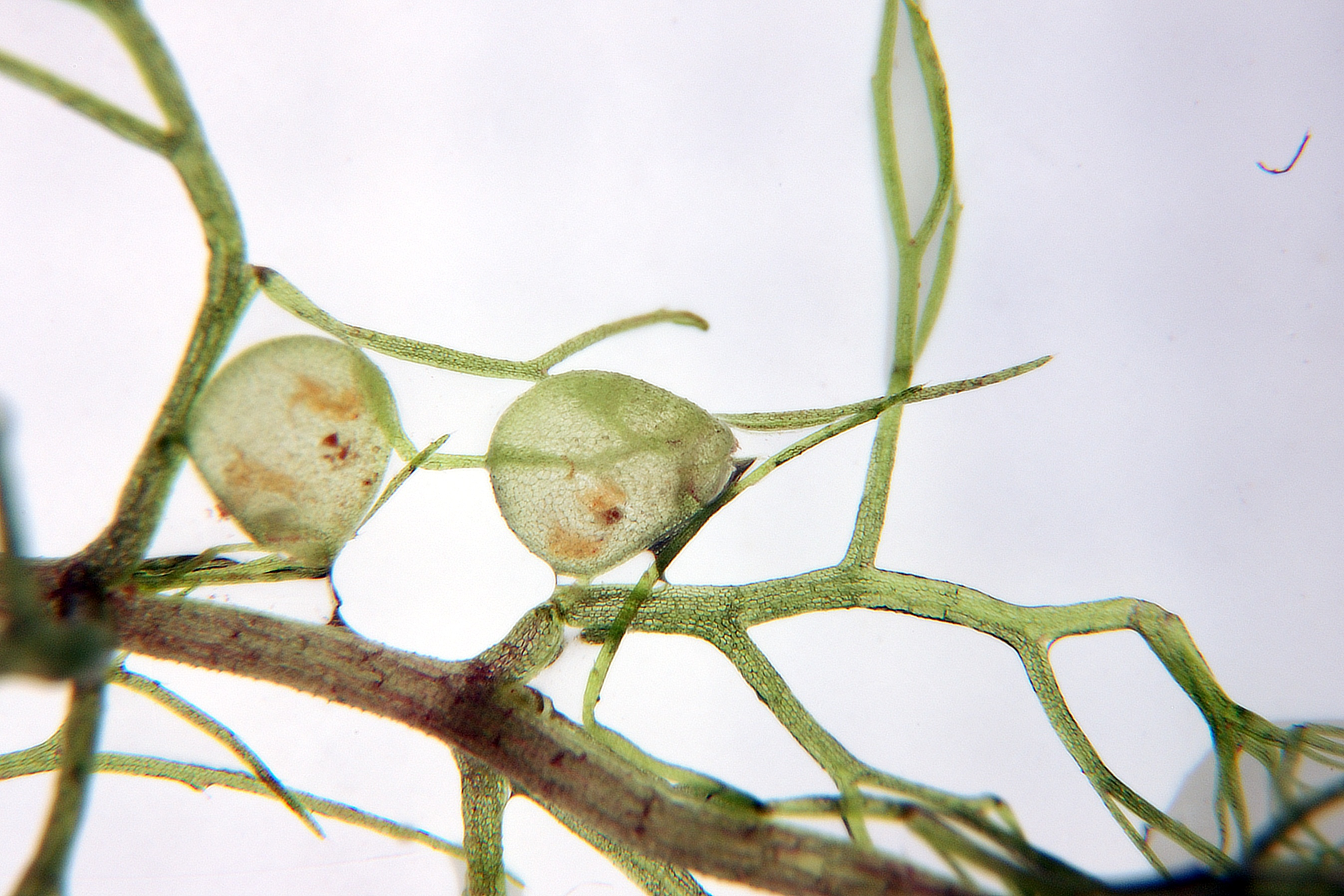
Traps of Utricularia aurea

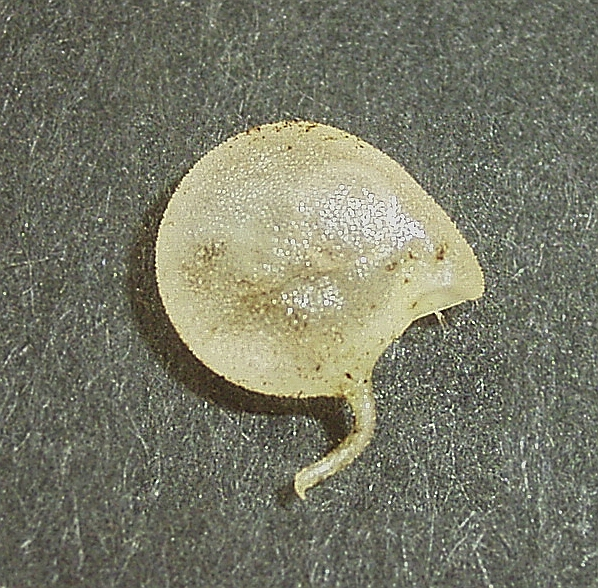
Trap of Utricularia hamiltonii

=== Physical description of the trap ===
Authorities on the genus, such as botanists Peter Taylor and Francis Ernest Lloyd, agree that the vacuum-driven bladders of Utricularia are the most sophisticated carnivorous trapping mechanism to be found anywhere in the plant kingdom. The bladders are usually shaped similarly to broad beans (though they come in various shapes) and attach to the submerged stolons by slender stalks.

Bladders are hollow underwater suction cups, also known as utricles, that possess a valve with bristles that open and close. The bladder walls are very thin and transparent but are sufficiently inflexible to maintain the bladder's shape despite the vacuum created within. The entrance, or 'mouth', of the trap is a circular or oval flap whose upper half is joined to the body of the trap by very flexible, yielding cells which form an effective hinge. The door rests on a platform formed by the thickening of the bladder wall immediately underneath. A soft but substantial membrane called the velum stretches in a curve around the middle of this platform, and helps seal the door. A second band of springy cells crosses the door just above its lower edge and provides the flexibility for the bottom of the door to become a bendable 'lip' which can make a perfect seal with the velum.

The outer cells of the whole trap excrete mucilage and under the door, this is produced in greater quantities and contains sugars. The mucilage certainly contributes towards the seal, and the sugars may help to attract prey.

Terrestrial species, like U. sandersonii have tiny traps (sometimes as small as 0.2 mm; 1/100") with a broad beak-like structure extending and curving down over the entrance; this forms a passageway to the trapdoor and may help prevent the trapping and ingestion of inorganic particles. Aquatic species, like U. inflata tend to have larger bladders—up to 1.2 cm (0.47 in)—and the mouth of the trap is usually surrounded not by a beak but by branching antennae, which serve both to guide prey animals to the trap's entrance and to fend the trap mouth away from larger bodies which might trigger the mechanism needlessly. Epiphytic species have unbranched antennae which curve in front of the mouth and probably serve the same purpose, although it has been observed that they are also capable of holding a pocket of water in front of the mouth by capillary action, and that this assists with the trapping action.

=== Trapping mechanism ===
Bladderwort traps: long, usually branching (but here simplified), antennae guide Daphnia to the trapdoors of an aquatic bladderwort.

Bladderwort trap mechanism: seen from below, a bladder squeezed by water excretion suddenly swells as its trapdoor is released by an errant Daphnia. The bladder sucks in the nearby water, including the unfortunate animal which triggered the trap.

The trapping mechanism of Utricularia is purely mechanical; no reaction from the plant (irritability) is required in the presence of prey, in contrast with the triggered mechanisms employed by Venus flytraps (Dionaea), waterwheels (Aldrovanda), and many sundews (Drosera). The only active mechanism involved is the constant pumping out of water through the bladder walls by active transport.

As water is pumped out, the bladder's walls are sucked inwards by the negative pressure created, and any dissolved material inside the bladder becomes more concentrated. The sides of the bladder bend inwards, storing potential energy like a spring. Eventually, no more water can be extracted, and the bladder trap is 'fully set' (technically, osmotic pressure rather than physical pressure is the limiting factor).

Extending outwards from the bottom of the trapdoor are several long bristle-stiff protuberances that are sometimes referred to as trigger hairs or antennae but which have no similarity to the sensitive triggers found in Dionaea and Aldrovanda. In fact, these bristles are simply levers. The suction force exerted by the primed bladder on the door is resisted by the adhesion of its flexible bottom against the soft-sealing velum. The equilibrium depends quite literally on a hair trigger, and the slightest touch to one of the lever hairs will deform the flexible door lip enough to create a tiny gap, breaking the seal.

Once the seal is disturbed, the bladder walls instantly spring back to a more rounded shape; the door flies open and a column of water is sucked into the bladder. The animal which touched the lever, if small enough, is inevitably drawn in, and as soon as the trap is filled, the door resumes its closed position—the whole operation being completed in as little as one-hundredth of a second.

Once inside, the prey is dissolved by digestive secretions. This generally occurs within a few hours, although some protozoa appear to be highly resistant and have been observed to live for several days inside the trap. All the time, the trap walls continue to pump out water, and the bladder can be ready for its next capture in as little as 15 to 30 minutes.

=== Microbial relationships ===
The bladders of Utricularia often culture a mutualistic community of microbes, which may be a very important factor in digestion of prey within Utricularia. Bacteria consume dissolved organic material which is not able to be directly ingested by larger organisms. When bacteria absorb dissolved organic material, they also release nutrients, which facilitates photo-autotrophic growth. As Utricularia's trap is sealed and contains all the needed components of a microbial food web, one can assume that much enzyme activity and available nutrients in Utricularia's trap fluid are derived from these microbial communities. Additionally, Utricularia traps often collect a diversity of microplankton and detritus. When this periphyton is dissolved into basic nutrients within the bladder environment, bacterial enzymes help aid in digestion. Therefore, carbon secretion and periphyton utilization in the utricles enable Utricularia to live with relatively little competition.

Mutualism could have been an important association in aquatic Utricularia trap evolution as these microbes may have allowed these plants to acquire the needed nutrients when they lost their roots, as they may have had issues acquiring phosphorus. Phosphorus was found to be the most important factor in Utricularia nutrition, which helps explain why Utricularia bladders are found with a wide diversity of bacteria to aid in phosphorus digestion.

=== Enhanced respiration ===
Utricularia have significantly greater respiration rates than most vegetative tissue, primarily due to their complex energy-dependent traps. Upon triggering, prey is captured through a two-step ATP-driven ion-pumping process where organisms are sucked in by internal negative pressure achieved by pumping water out of the trap and into the external environment. Recent research suggests that COX subunit I (COX1), a rate limiting enzyme in the cellular respiration pathway associated with the synthesis of ATP, has evolved under positive Darwinian selection in the Utricularia–Genlisea clade. There appear to be adaptive substitutions of two contiguous cysteines (C-C motif) at the docking point of COX1 helix 3 and cytochrome c. This C-C motif, absent in ~99.9% of databased Eukaryota, Archaea, and Bacteria, suggests a conformational change that might decouple electron transport from proton pumping. By doing so, the intermembrane space could sequester protons and store them until the ATP is needed. Such decoupling would allow Utricularia to optimize power output (energy × rate) during times of need, albeit with a 20% cost in energy efficiency.

According to the ROS mutation hypothesis, the sequestration of these protons has cellular consequences, which could lead to nucleotide substitutions. Oxidative phosphorylation is an imperfect process, which allows electrons to leak into the lumen, and only partially reduce oxygen. This partially reduced oxygen is a reactive oxygen species (ROS) which can be very harmful, unlike its fully reduced counterpart, the water molecule. When there is greater potential change between the lumen and intermembrane space, the leakiness of the electron transport chain also increases, therefore creating a higher production of ROS in the mitochondria of Utricularia. ROS is harmful to cells, as it produces damage to nucleotides and helical DNA. Therefore, the increased cellular respiration of Utricularia bladders combined with the unique sequestration of protons could lead to its high nucleotide substitution rates, and therefore its wide diversity.

This structural evolution seems highly unlikely to have arisen by chance alone; therefore, many researchers suggest this key adaption in Utricularia allowed for radical morphological evolution of relatively simple trap structures to highly complex and efficient snares. This adaptation may have enhanced the genus' fitness by increasing its range of prey, rate of capture, and retention of nutrients during prey decomposition.

=== Lloyd's experiments ===
In the 1940s, Francis Ernest Lloyd conducted extensive experiments with carnivorous plants, including Utricularia, and settled many points which had previously been the subject of conjecture. He proved that the mechanism of the trap was purely mechanical by both killing the trigger hairs with iodine and subsequently showing that the response was unaffected, and by demonstrating that the trap could be made ready to spring a second (or third) time immediately after being set off if the bladder's excretion of water were helped by a gentle squeeze; in other words, the delay of at least fifteen minutes between trap springings is due solely to the time needed to excrete water, and the triggers need no time to recover irritability (unlike the reactive trigger hairs of Venus flytraps, for example).

He tested the role of the velum by showing that the trap will never set if small cuts are made to it; and showed that the excretion of water can be continued under all conditions likely to be found in the natural environment, but can be prevented by driving the osmotic pressure in the trap beyond normal limits by the introduction of glycerine.

=== Ingestion of larger prey ===
Lloyd devoted several studies to the possibility, often recounted but never previously accounted for under scientific conditions, that Utricularia can consume larger prey such as young tadpoles and mosquito larvae by catching them by the tail, and ingesting them bit by bit.

Prior to Lloyd, several authors had reported this phenomenon and had attempted to explain it by positing that creatures caught by the tail repeatedly set off the trap as they thrash about in an attempt to escape—even as their tails are actively digested by the plant. Lloyd, however, demonstrated that the plant is quite capable of ingestion by stages without the need of multiple stimuli.

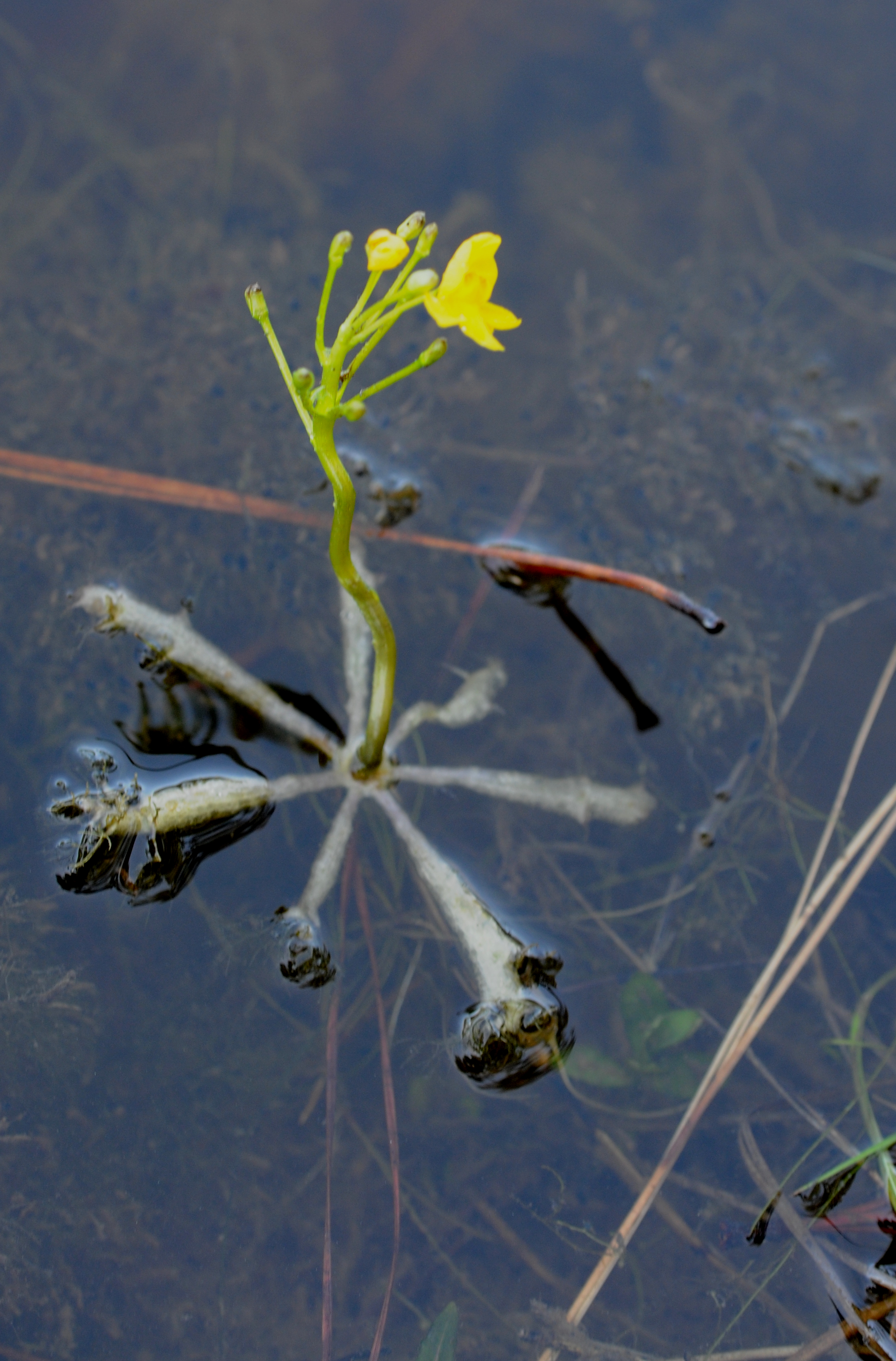
The flower stem of the aquatic Utricularia inflata is held aloft by a rosette of floats.

He produced suitable artificial "prey" for his experiments by stirring albumen (egg white) into hot water and selecting shreds of an appropriate length and thickness. When caught by one end, the strand would gradually be drawn in, sometimes in sudden jumps, and at other times by a slow and continuous motion. Strands of albumen would often be fully ingested in as little as twenty minutes.

Mosquito larvae, caught by the tail, would be engulfed bit by bit. A typical example given by Lloyd showed that a larva of a size at the upper limit of what the trap could manage would be ingested stage by stage over the course of about twenty-four hours; but that the head, being rigid, would often prove too large for the mouth of the trap and would remain outside, plugging the door. When this happened, the trap evidently formed an effective seal with the head of the larva as it could still excrete water and become flattened, but it would nevertheless die within about ten days "evidently due to overfeeding".

Softer-bodied prey of the same size such as small tadpoles could be ingested completely, because they have no rigid parts and the head, although capable of plugging the door for a time, will soften and yield and finally be drawn in.

Very thin strands of albumen could be soft and fine enough to allow the trapdoor to close completely; these would not be drawn in any further unless the trigger hairs were indeed stimulated again. On the other hand, a human hair, finer still but relatively hard and unyielding, could prevent a seal being formed; these would prevent the trap from resetting at all due to leakage of water.

Lloyd concluded that the sucking action produced by the excretion of water from the bladder was sufficient to draw larger soft-bodied prey into the trap without the need for a second or further touch to the trigger levers. An animal long enough not to be fully engulfed upon first springing the trap, but thin and soft enough to allow the door to return fully to its set position, would indeed be left partly outside the trap until it or another body triggered the mechanism once again. However, the capture of hard bodies not fully drawn into the trap would prevent its further operation.

== Genetics ==
Chris Whitewoods has developed a computational model of possible genetic regulation in Utricularia gibba to show how genes may control the formation of the upper and lower surfaces of flat leaves and how cup-shaped traps may have evolved from flat leaves. Changes in the gene expression of Utricularia can explain these structural changes. U. gibba leaves appear similar early in development but may develop into either a spherical trap or a cylindrical leaflet at later stages. Directional expansion of the leaf is suggested to be a crucial driver of the trap's morphogenesis. The upper and lower faces of the leaf are differentially associated with genetic markers. The marker UgPHV1 is associated with the upper leaf face. Trap primordia become spherical in shape, due to growth in both the longitudinal and transverse directions, when UgPHV1 / PHAVOLUTA (PHV) is restricted. Expression of UgPHV1 inhibits trap development and leads to the formation of leaflets. The same model can be used to describe shape development of other leaf shapes, including the pitcher-shaped Sarracenia trap, in terms of the spatial regulation of gene expression.

Increased respiration rates caused by mutated COXI may have caused two additional traits in the Utricularia–Genlisea clade: i) greatly increased rates of nucleotide substitution and ii) a dynamic decrease of genome size, including Utricularia species with some of the smallest haploid angiosperm genomes known. A recent study conducted three cDNA libraries from different organs of U. gibba (~80Mb) as part of a large scale Utricularia nuclear genome sequencing project. They recorded increased nucleotide substitution rates in chloroplast, mitochondrial, and cellular genomes. They also recorded increased levels of DNA repair-associated proteins and reactive oxygen species (ROS)-detox. ROS is a product of cellular metabolism that can potentially cause cellular damage when accumulated in high amounts. They determined the expression of DNA repair and ROS detox was ubiquitous rather than trap-specific. Due to this ubiquitous expression, relative ROS detoxification is expected to be lower in trap structures due to the high respiratory rate caused by trap activations, eventually leading to higher toxic effects and mutagenesis. Mutagenic action of enhanced ROS production may explain both high rates of nucleotide substitution and the dynamic evolution of genome size (via double strand breaks).

The dramatic shift in genome size and high mutation rates may have allowed for the variations observed in Utricularia bladder size, root structure, and relaxed body formation. Overall, the introduction of mutated COXI and high mutation rates provide a strong evolutionary hypothesis for the variability found in Utricularia species.

== Species ==
Utricularia is the largest genus of carnivorous plants. It is one of the three genera that make up the Bladderwort family (Lentibulariaceae), along with the butterworts (Pinguicula) and corkscrew plants (Genlisea).

This genus was considered to have 250 species until Peter Taylor reduced the number to 214 in his exhaustive study The genus Utricularia – a taxonomic monograph, published by Her Majesty's Stationery Office in 1989. Taylor's classification is now generally accepted with modifications based on phylogenetic studies (see below).

The genus Polypompholyx, the pink petticoats, contained just two species of carnivorous plant, Polypompholyx tenella and Polypompholyx multifida, previously distinguished from the otherwise similar genus Utricularia by their possession of four calyx lobes rather than two. The genus has now been subsumed into Utricularia.

The genus Biovularia contained the species Biovularia olivacea (also known as B. brasiliensis or B. minima) and Biovularia cymbantha. The genus has been subsumed into Utricularia.

== Phylogenetics ==
The following cladogram shows the relationship between various subgenera and sections. It summarizes the results of two studies (Jobson et al. 2003; Müller et al. 2004), following Müller et al. 2006. Since the sections Aranella and Vesiculina are polyphyletic, they show up multiple times in the cladogram (*). Some monotypic sections have not been included in the study, so that their place in this system is unclear. Sections that are not included below are Candollea, Chelidon, Choristothecae, Kamienskia, Martinia, Meionula, Mirabiles, Oliveria, Setiscapella, Sprucea, Steyermarkia, and Stylotheca in subgenus Utricularia; Minutae in subgenus Bivalvaria; and Tridentaria in subgenus Polypompholyx.

- - - Subgenus Utricularia
      - - - - - Section Avesicaria
              - * Section Vesiculina
            - - Utricularia olivacea
              - * Section Vesiculina
          - Section Nelipus
        - - Section Lecticula
          - Section Utricularia
      - - Section Orchidioides
        - Section Foliosa
    - Subgenus Bivalvaria
      - - - - - - - Section Oligocista
                  - Section Avesicarioides
                - Section Benjaminia
              - - Section Stomoisia
                - Section Enskide
            - * Section Aranella
          - - Section Calpidisca
            - Section Lloydia
            - Section Australes
        - - Section Nigrescentes
          - Section Phyllaria
      - * Section Aranella
  - Subgenus Polypompholyx
    - Section Pleiochasia
    - Section Polypompholyx
