= Aranella fimbriata =

Aranella fimbriata is a taxonomic synonym that may refer to:

- Utricularia longeciliata syn. [Aranella fimbriata Gleason]
- Utricularia fimbriata syn. [Aranella fimbriata (Kunth) Barnhart]
- Utricularia simulans syn. [Aranella fimbriata Barnhart]
