= Polypompholyx laciniata =

Polypompholyx laciniata is a taxonomic synonym that has been used to refer to:

- Utricularia longeciliata syn. Polypompholyx laciniata Benj.
- Utricularia simulans syn. Polypompholyx laciniata Benj.
