= Cosmiza longeciliata =

Cosmiza longeciliata is a taxonomic synonym that can refer to:

- Utricularia longeciliata syn. Cosmiza longeciliata (A.DC.) Small
- Utricularia simulans syn. [Cosmiza longeciliata Small]
