= Utricularia regia =

Scientific classification
- Kingdom: Plantae
- Clade: Tracheophytes
- Clade: Angiosperms
- Clade: Eudicots
- Clade: Asterids
- Order: Lamiales
- Family: Lentibulariaceae
- Genus: Utricularia
- Subgenus: Utricularia subg. Utricularia
- Section: Utricularia sect. Foliosa
- Species: U. regia

Binomial name
- Utricularia regia Zamudio & Olvera

Species of carnivorous plant

Utricularia regia is a carnivorous plant that belongs to the genus Utricularia and is endemic to the Sierra Madre del Sur region of Guerrero, Mexico. It is similar to U. hintonii and U. petersoniae, but it is easily distinguished from these species by the unusual 4-lobed division of the upper corolla lip and the unique color pattern. Utricularia regia is an annual rupicolous species that is found growing among rocks with mosses and Selaginella in pine forests at altitudes from 1,650 m (5,413 ft) to 1,900 m (6,234 ft). It grows during the rainy season and flowers from September to October, producing fruit from October to early November. The specific epithet regia was chosen because of the appearance of an inverted crown in the markings of the lower corolla lip. It was discovered in 2005 and collected again on subsequent botanical explorations in preparation for the Flora de Guerrero. It was formally described in a 2009 volume of Brittonia by Sergio Zamudio and Martha Olvera. The authors placed the new species into Peter Taylor's section Psyllosperma, which has subsequently been merged with section Foliosa based on molecular phylogenetics.

== See also ==
- List of Utricularia species
