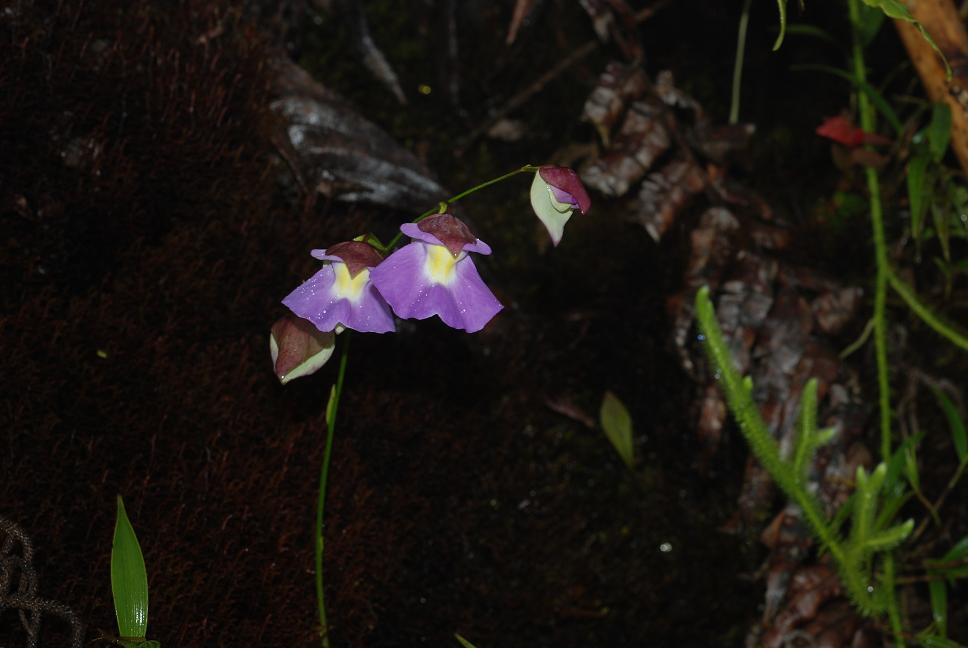

Conservation status
- Least Concern (IUCN 3.1)

Scientific classification
- Kingdom: Plantae
- Clade: Tracheophytes
- Clade: Angiosperms
- Clade: Eudicots
- Clade: Asterids
- Order: Lamiales
- Family: Lentibulariaceae
- Genus: Utricularia
- Subgenus: Utricularia subg. Utricularia
- Section: Utricularia sect. Orchidioides
- Species: U. unifolia

Binomial name
- Utricularia unifolia Ruiz & Pav.

Synonyms
- U. alpina Vahl; U. montana Griseb.

= Utricularia unifolia =

Species of plant

Utricularia unifolia is a species of perennial, medium-sized carnivorous plant that belongs to the family Lentibulariaceae. U. unifolia is native to Central America (Costa Rica, Nicaragua, and Panama) and western South America (Bolivia, Colombia, Ecuador, Peru, and Venezuela). It was originally published and described by Hipólito Ruiz López and José Antonio Pavón Jiménez in 1797 and later considered a synonym of Utricularia alpina until Peter Taylor's 1989 monograph on the genus where he restored the species as distinct from U. alpina. It grows as a terrestrial or epiphytic plant on moss-covered trees, rocks, or banks in cloud forests at altitudes between 2,000 m (6,562 ft) and 3,000 m (9,843 ft). U. unifolia usually produces only one leaf (rarely two or three), which is where the species epithet "unifolia" is derived from.

== See also ==
- List of Utricularia species
