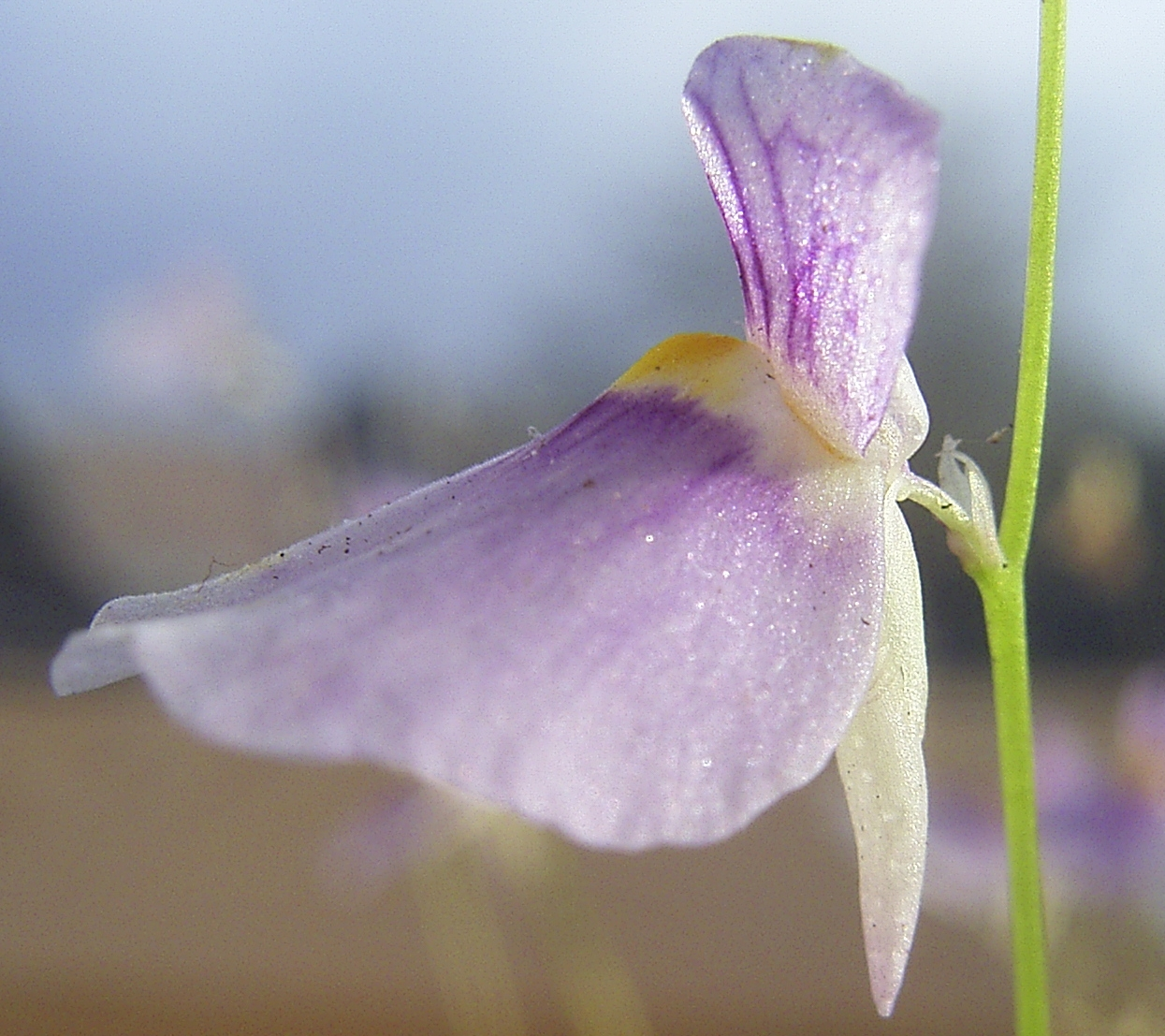
- Utricularia blanchetii

Scientific classification
- Kingdom: Plantae
- Clade: Tracheophytes
- Clade: Angiosperms
- Clade: Eudicots
- Clade: Asterids
- Order: Lamiales
- Family: Lentibulariaceae
- Genus: Utricularia
- Subgenus: Utricularia subg. Bivalvaria
- Section: Utricularia sect. Aranella (Barnhart) P.Taylor

Type species
- U. fimbriata Kunth

Species
- Utricularia blanchetii; Utricularia costata; Utricularia fimbriata; Utricularia laciniata; Utricularia longeciliata; Utricularia parthenopipes; Utricularia purpureocaerulea; Utricularia rostrata; Utricularia sandwithii; Utricularia simulans

Synonyms
- Aranella Barnhart; Utricularia subg. Aranella (Barnhart) Komiya

= Utricularia sect. Aranella =

Group of carnivorous plants

Utricularia sect. Aranella is a section in the genus Utricularia. The ten species in this section are small terrestrial carnivorous plants native to tropical South America with one species also extending into tropical Africa. John Hendley Barnhart originally described and published this section in 1913 as a separate genus, Aranella. Sadashi Komiya revised the genus Utricularia in a 1973 taxonomic review and placed Barnhart's genus at the rank of subgenus within Utricularia. Peter Taylor then published his taxonomic monograph of Utricularia in 1986 in which he reduced Komiya's subgenus to the rank of section, placing it within subgenus Utricularia. More recent phylogenetic data and revisions have reinstated subgenus Bivalvaria and have placed this section within it.

== See also ==
- List of Utricularia species
