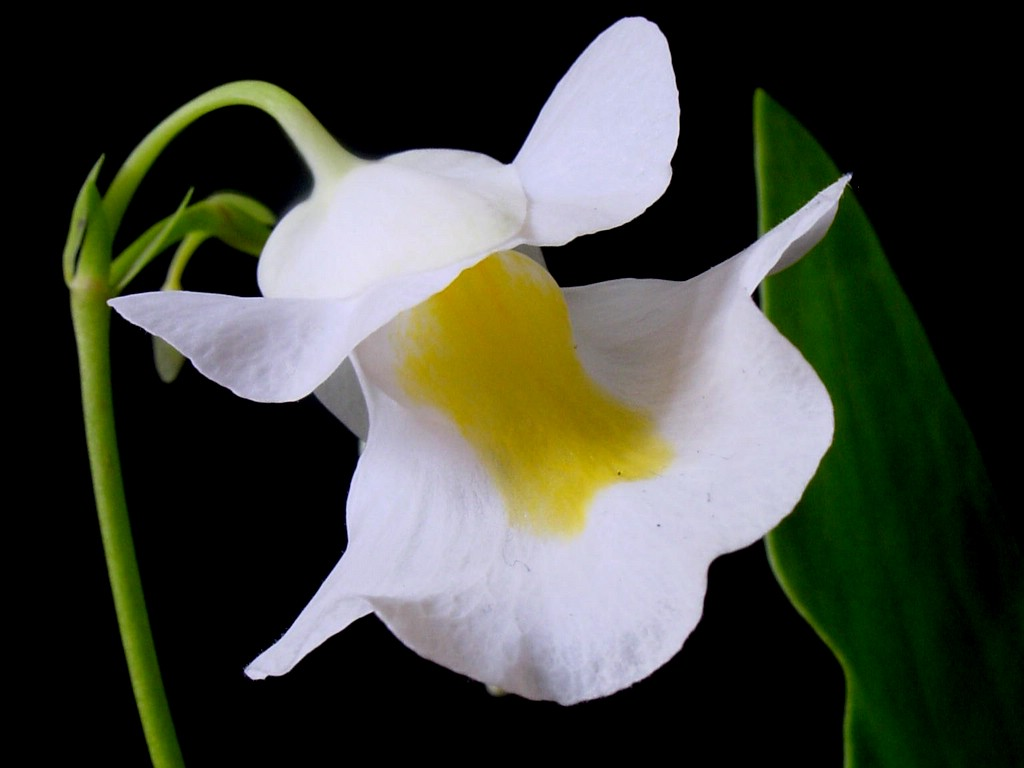
- Utricularia alpina

Scientific classification
- Kingdom: Plantae
- Clade: Tracheophytes
- Clade: Angiosperms
- Clade: Eudicots
- Clade: Asterids
- Order: Lamiales
- Family: Lentibulariaceae
- Genus: Utricularia
- Subgenus: Utricularia subg. Utricularia
- Section: Utricularia sect. Orchidioides; A.DC.

Type species
- U. alpina Jacq.

Species
- Utricularia alpina; Utricularia asplundii; Utricularia buntingiana; Utricularia campbelliana; Utricularia cornigera; Utricularia endresii; Utricularia geminiloba; Utricularia humboldtii; Utricularia jamesoniana; Utricularia nelumbifolia; Utricularia nephrophylla; Utricularia praetermissa; Utricularia quelchii; Utricularia reniformis; Utricularia unifolia; Utricularia uxoris

Synonyms
- Orchyllium Barnhart

= Utricularia sect. Orchidioides =

Group of carnivorous plants

Utricularia sect. Orchidioides is a section in the genus Utricularia. The species in this section are small or medium-sized terrestrial or epiphytic carnivorous plants native to Central and South America. Alphonse Pyrame de Candolle originally published this section in 1844. In 1916, John Hendley Barnhart moved the section to its own genus, Orchyllium, recognizing that the species in this section are distinct. Several other botanists, including Henry Gleason, considered the treatment of these species in the genus Orchyllium valid and moved other species from Utricularia to Orchyllium. Ultimately the species were all reunited under Utricularia.

== See also ==
- List of Utricularia species
