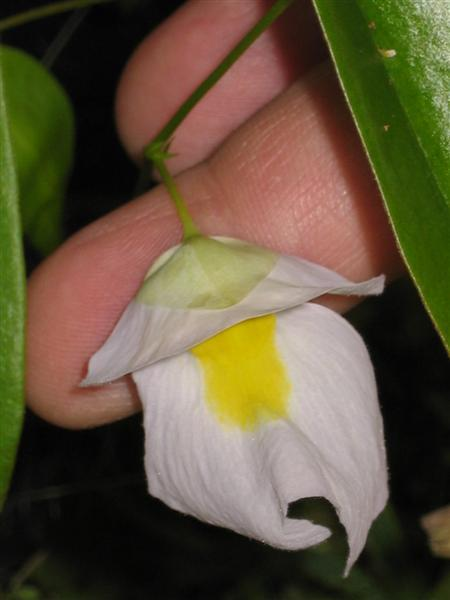

Scientific classification
- Kingdom: Plantae
- Clade: Tracheophytes
- Clade: Angiosperms
- Clade: Eudicots
- Clade: Asterids
- Order: Lamiales
- Family: Lentibulariaceae
- Genus: Utricularia
- Subgenus: Utricularia subg. Utricularia
- Section: Utricularia sect. Orchidioides
- Species: U. endresii

Binomial name
- Utricularia endresii Rchb.

Synonyms
- Ochyllium endresii (Rchb.) Barnhart ex McIntyre & Chrysler; [U. alpina P.Taylor]

= Utricularia endresii =

Species of carnivorous plant

Utricularia endresii is a medium-sized epiphytic, perennial carnivorous plant that belongs to the genus Utricularia. U. endresii is endemic to Central America, (Costa Rica and Panama) and northwestern South America (Colombia and Ecuador). It was originally published and described by the orchidologist Ludwig Reichenbach, who originally described it as a "Lentibulariaceous Orchid," a name which seems to have stuck for some time after its description in 1874. It was even cultivated in orchid houses. It is named in honor of A. R. Endres, the person who originally collected the first specimens sent to Reichenbach for description.

== See also ==
- List of Utricularia species
