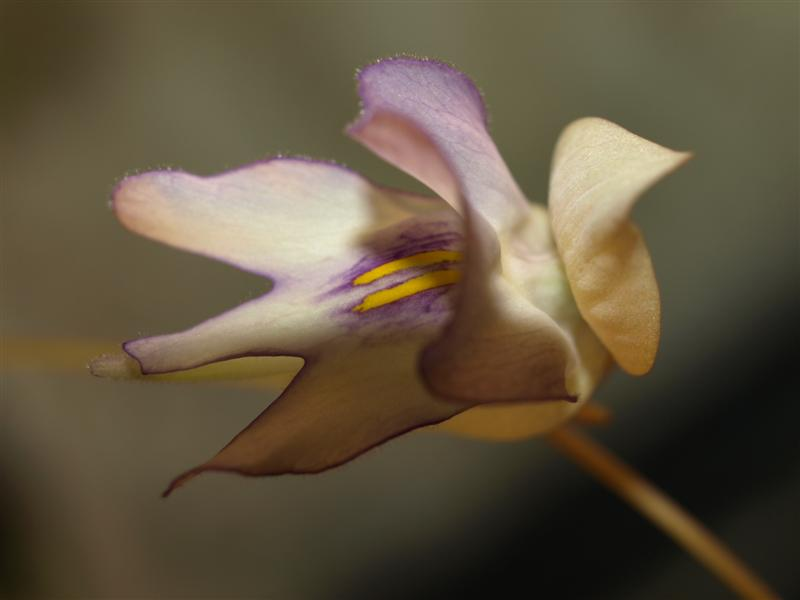

Scientific classification
- Kingdom: Plantae
- Clade: Tracheophytes
- Clade: Angiosperms
- Clade: Eudicots
- Clade: Asterids
- Order: Lamiales
- Family: Lentibulariaceae
- Genus: Utricularia
- Subgenus: Utricularia subg. Utricularia
- Section: Utricularia sect. Orchidioides
- Species: U. asplundii

Binomial name
- Utricularia asplundii P.Taylor

Synonyms
- [U. jamesoniana A.Fernández]

= Utricularia asplundii =

Species of carnivorous plant

Utricularia asplundii is a small to medium-sized terrestrial or epiphytic, perennial carnivorous plant that belongs to the genus Utricularia. U. asplundii is endemic to western South America and is found in Colombia and Ecuador. It was originally published and described by Peter Taylor in 1975. Specimens cited by Alvaro Fernández-Pérez in 1964 from Colombia as U. jamesoniana were partly U. jamesoniana and partly U. asplundii.

== See also ==
- List of Utricularia species
