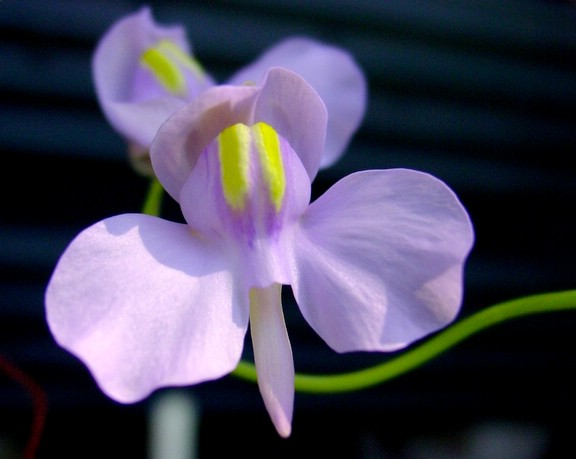

Scientific classification
- Kingdom: Plantae
- Clade: Tracheophytes
- Clade: Angiosperms
- Clade: Eudicots
- Clade: Asterids
- Order: Lamiales
- Family: Lentibulariaceae
- Genus: Utricularia
- Subgenus: Utricularia subg. Utricularia
- Section: Utricularia sect. Orchidioides
- Species: U. nelumbifolia

Binomial name
- Utricularia nelumbifolia Gardner

Synonyms
- U. nelumbifolia var. macahensis Fromm

= Utricularia nelumbifolia =

Species of carnivorous plant

Utricularia nelumbifolia is a perennial aquatic carnivorous plant that belongs to the genus Utricularia. U. nelumbifolia is endemic to Brazil. It was originally published and described by George Gardner in 1842. Its habitat is reported as being restricted to the water-filled leaf axils of bromeliads in the genus Vriesea in arid volcanic locations at altitudes from 800 m (2,625 ft) to 2,200 m (7,200 ft). U. nelumbifolia will produce aerial stolons that descend into nearby leaf axils in order to colonize new territory, similar to the habit of U. humboldtii. It typically flowers from May to August. Beside the whole, round, peltate leaves above water, there are submerged, divided leaves bearing insect traps.

== See also ==
- List of Utricularia species
