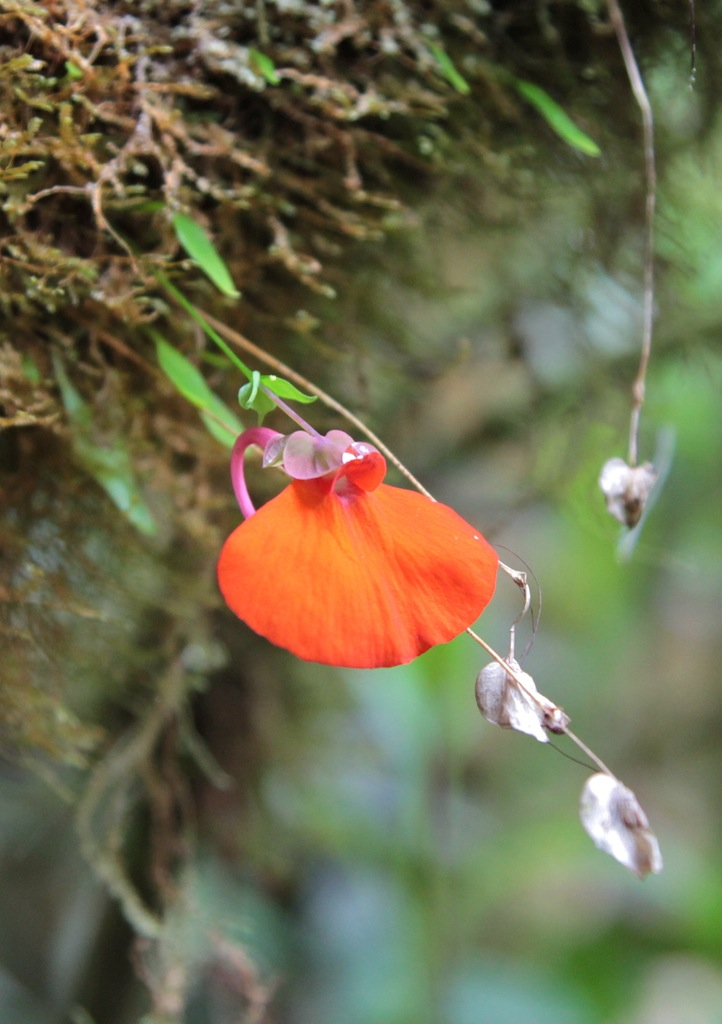
- Utricularia campbelliana from Mount Roraima

Conservation status
- Least Concern (IUCN 3.1)

Scientific classification
- Kingdom: Plantae
- Clade: Tracheophytes
- Clade: Angiosperms
- Clade: Eudicots
- Clade: Asterids
- Order: Lamiales
- Family: Lentibulariaceae
- Genus: Utricularia
- Subgenus: Utricularia subg. Utricularia
- Section: Utricularia sect. Orchidioides
- Species: U. campbelliana

Binomial name
- Utricularia campbelliana Oliv.

Synonyms
- Ochyllium campbellianum (Oliver) Gleason; U. campbelliana var. minor Steyerm.

= Utricularia campbelliana =

Species of carnivorous plant

Utricularia campbelliana is a small epiphytic, perennial carnivorous plant that belongs to the genus Utricularia. U. campbelliana is endemic to northern South America, where it is found in Guyana and Venezuela and most likely also Brazil, though no positive records exist from that country. It was originally published and described by Daniel Oliver in 1887. It is named in honor of William Hunter Campbell, an attorney and amateur botanist who lived in Georgetown, Guyana. Its habitat is reported as being tree trunks, branches, and prop roots (mostly of Bonnetia species) at altitudes from 1,500 metres (4,921 ft) to 2,500 metres (8,202 ft), but has been found at altitudes as low as 690 metres (2,264 ft). It has been seen flowering between August and April. In his 1989 monograph on the genus, Peter Taylor noted that at least one specimen has been recorded as being visited by a hummingbird and it is likely that both U. campbelliana and U. quelchii are bird-pollinated.

== See also ==
- List of Utricularia species
