= Utricularia buntingiana =

Scientific classification
- Kingdom: Plantae
- Clade: Embryophytes
- Clade: Tracheophytes
- Clade: Angiosperms
- Clade: Eudicots
- Clade: Asterids
- Order: Lamiales
- Family: Lentibulariaceae
- Genus: Utricularia
- Subgenus: Utricularia subg. Utricularia
- Section: Utricularia sect. Orchidioides
- Species: U. buntingiana

Binomial name
- Utricularia buntingiana P.Taylor

Species of carnivorous plant

Utricularia buntingiana is a small epiphytic, perennial carnivorous plant that belongs to the genus Utricularia. U. buntingiana is endemic to Venezuela, where it is only known from a few locations: the type location in Henri Pittier National Park, one collection on the Paraguaná Peninsula, and a few others from Falcón. It was originally published and described by Peter Taylor in 1975. Its habitat is reported as being mossy trees in montane forests at altitudes from 830 metres (2,723 ft) to 1,775 metres (5,823 ft). It has been seen flowering in June and July. Both U. buntingiana and U. praetermissa possess a double-curved corolla spur.

== See also ==
- List of Utricularia species
