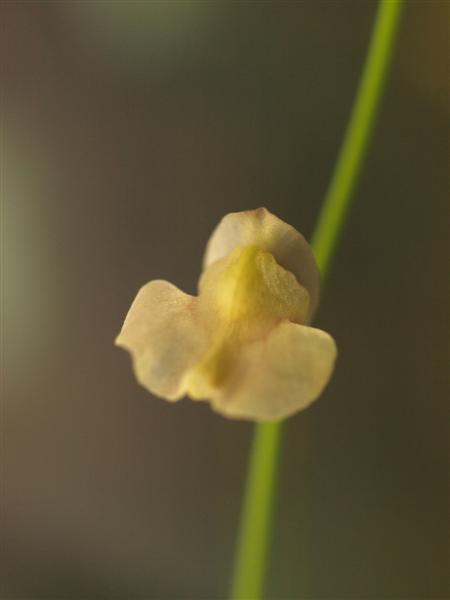

Scientific classification
- Kingdom: Plantae
- Clade: Tracheophytes
- Clade: Angiosperms
- Clade: Eudicots
- Clade: Asterids
- Order: Lamiales
- Family: Lentibulariaceae
- Genus: Utricularia
- Subgenus: Utricularia subg. Utricularia
- Section: Utricularia sect. Foliosa
- Species: U. hispida

Binomial name
- Utricularia hispida Lam.

Synonyms
- Calpidisca hispida (Lam.) Barnhart; [U. amethystina P.Taylor]; U. angustifolia Benj.; U. baldwinii Steyerm.; U. glueckii Luetzelb.; U. macerrima S.F.Blake; U. picta Warm.; [U. praelonga P.Taylor]

= Utricularia hispida =

Species of carnivorous plant

Utricularia hispida is a medium-sized terrestrial carnivorous plant that belongs to the genus Utricularia. Utricularia hispida, which is usually a perennial plant, is endemic to Central and South America.

== See also ==
- List of Utricularia species
