= Utricularia uxoris =

Scientific classification
- Kingdom: Plantae
- Clade: Tracheophytes
- Clade: Angiosperms
- Clade: Eudicots
- Clade: Asterids
- Order: Lamiales
- Family: Lentibulariaceae
- Genus: Utricularia
- Subgenus: Utricularia subg. Utricularia
- Section: Utricularia sect. Orchidioides
- Species: U. uxoris

Binomial name
- Utricularia uxoris Gómez-Laur.

Species of carnivorous plant

Utricularia uxoris is a small epiphytic carnivorous plant in the genus Utricularia that is endemic to Costa Rica. It is distinguished from all other members of section Orchidioides in having green glabrous flowers with a white spur and its small size. The species is only known from its type locality in Reserva Biológica El Copal, Cartago Province. It was collected in 2004 by Jorge Gómez-Laurito, Diego Salazar, and Jorge Carmona and then formally described in 2005 by Gómez-Laurito (2005).

Utricularia uxoris is possibly just a form or variety of U. jamesoniana, but Gómez-Laurito indicated in his original description of U. uxoris that it has shallow corolla lobe divisions, compared to the deeply dissected corolla lobes found on U. jamesoniana flowers.

== See also ==
- List of Utricularia species

== Sources ==
- Gómez-Laurito, J (2005). "Utricularia uxoris (Lentibulariaceae), una nueva especie Costarricense de la sect Orchidioides" (PDF). Lankesteriana. 5 (2): 137–139.
- Rice, Barry A. (2010). "The Carnivorous Plant FAQ v.12". Archived from the original on 5 March 2016.
