= Utricularia cornigera =

Scientific classification
- Kingdom: Plantae
- Clade: Tracheophytes
- Clade: Angiosperms
- Clade: Eudicots
- Clade: Asterids
- Order: Lamiales
- Family: Lentibulariaceae
- Genus: Utricularia
- Subgenus: Utricularia subg. Utricularia
- Section: Utricularia sect. Orchidioides
- Species: U. cornigera

Binomial name
- Utricularia cornigera Studnička

Species of carnivorous plant

Utricularia cornigera is a large perennial carnivorous plant that belongs to the genus Utricularia. U. cornigera was described in 2009 by Miloslav Studnička based on his study of the variation in cultivated plants labeled Utricularia reniformis and apparent different geographic ranges. U. cornigera is found on Serra dos Órgãos in south-eastern Brazil and as of the new species' description, was not found in the presence of U. reniformis. Utricularia cornigera has been grown in cultivation under the name U. reniformis and with the cultivar name 'Big Sister'. It differs from U. reniformis by having 6-8 primordial leaves emerging from the seed during germination with a float and whorl of leaves. Utricularia cornigera also produces two distinct types of bladder traps that are dimorphic and it generally has larger leaves.

== See also ==
- List of Utricularia species
