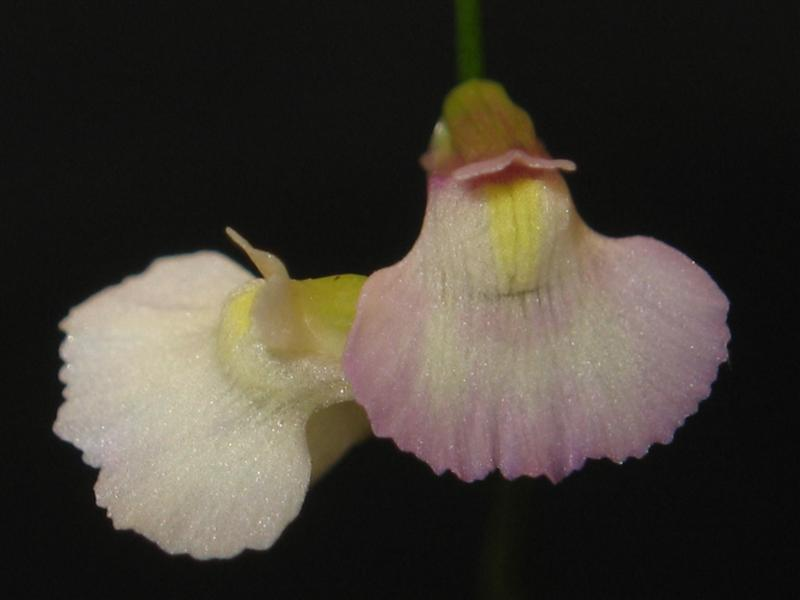

Scientific classification
- Kingdom: Plantae
- Clade: Tracheophytes
- Clade: Angiosperms
- Clade: Eudicots
- Clade: Asterids
- Order: Lamiales
- Family: Lentibulariaceae
- Genus: Utricularia
- Subgenus: Utricularia subg. Bivalvaria
- Section: Utricularia sect. Aranella
- Species: U. rostrata

Binomial name
- Utricularia rostrata A.Fleischm. & Rivadavia

= Utricularia rostrata =

Species of carnivorous plant

Utricularia rostrata is a small annual (occasionally a perennial) carnivorous plant that belongs to the genus Utricularia. U. rostrata is endemic to the Chapada Diamantina highlands of Bahia, Brazil. It grows as a terrestrial plant in damp sandy soils near streams and waterfalls in semi-shaded areas at altitudes from 550 to 1,570 metres (1,800 to 5,150 ft). It was originally described and published by Andreas Fleischmann and Fernando Rivadavia in 2009, though specimens of this species had been discovered as early as 1992. Fleischmann and Rivadavia note that the species is common throughout the Chapada Diamantina highlands and its distribution includes Chapada Diamantina National Park, thus justifying its ranking as a species of Least Concern under the IUCN.

Flowers of U. rostrata are white, mauve, or violet and the lower corolla lip has a yellow area on it. It has been placed in section Aranella and appears to be most closely related to U. costata, though it differs from all members of section Aranella in its rostrate upper calyx lobe.

== See also ==
- List of Utricularia species
