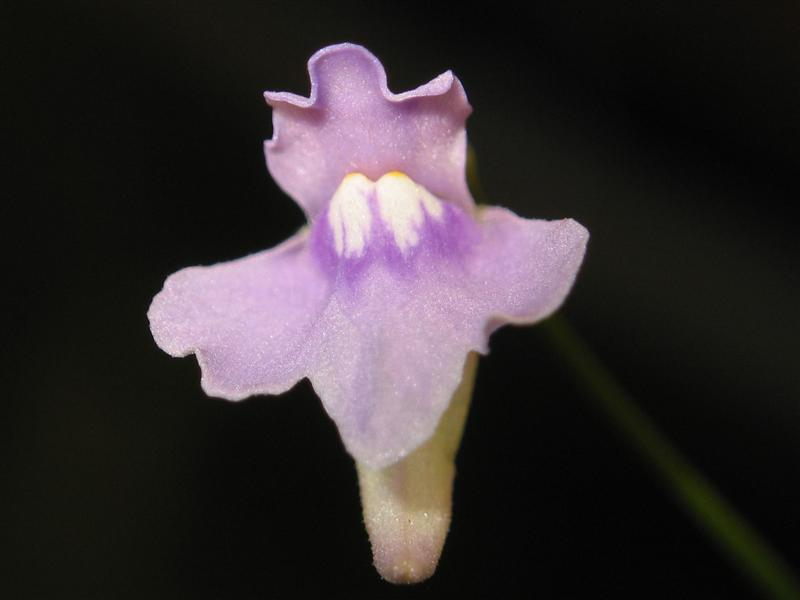

Scientific classification
- Kingdom: Plantae
- Clade: Tracheophytes
- Clade: Angiosperms
- Clade: Eudicots
- Clade: Asterids
- Order: Lamiales
- Family: Lentibulariaceae
- Genus: Utricularia
- Subgenus: Utricularia subg. Utricularia
- Section: Utricularia sect. Foliosa
- Species: U. tridentata

Binomial name
- Utricularia tridentata Sylvén

Synonyms
- [U. amethystina P.Taylor]; U. ostenii Hicken; U. rubra Larrañaga; U. ternata Sylvén

= Utricularia tridentata =

Species of carnivorous plant

Utricularia tridentata is a small terrestrial carnivorous plant that belongs to the genus Utricularia. U. tridentata is endemic to South America, where it is found in Argentina, Brazil, and Uruguay.

== See also ==
- List of Utricularia species
