= Utricularia fimbriata =

Scientific classification
- Kingdom: Plantae
- Clade: Embryophytes
- Clade: Tracheophytes
- Clade: Angiosperms
- Clade: Eudicots
- Clade: Asterids
- Order: Lamiales
- Family: Lentibulariaceae
- Genus: Utricularia
- Subgenus: Utricularia subg. Bivalvaria
- Section: Utricularia sect. Aranella
- Species: U. fimbriata

Binomial name
- Utricularia fimbriata Kunth

Synonyms
- Aranella fimbriata (Kunth) Barnhart

Species of carnivorous plant

Utricularia fimbriata is a small to medium-sized, probably perennial carnivorous plant that belongs to the genus Utricularia. U. fimbriata is endemic to Colombia and Venezuela. It grows as a terrestrial plant in damp, sandy soils in savannas at altitudes from near sea level to 300 m (984 ft). It was originally described and published by Carl Sigismund Kunth in 1818. In 1913, John Hendley Barnhart treated this species as part of a new genus, Aranella, which was later reduced to the taxonomic rank of section within the genus Utricularia, thus bringing the species back to the original genus.

== See also ==
- List of Utricularia species
