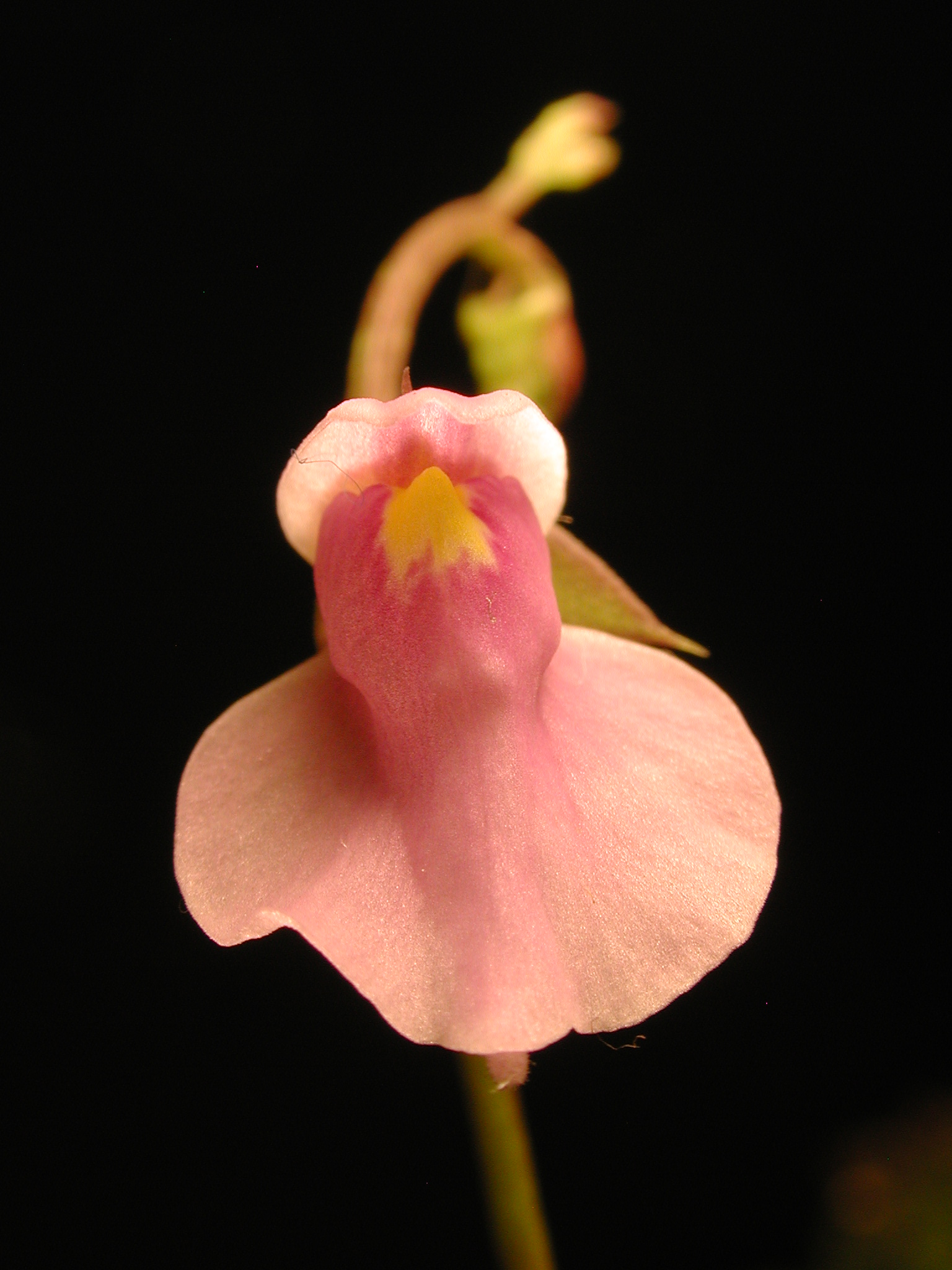
- Utricularia calycifida

Scientific classification
- Kingdom: Plantae
- Clade: Tracheophytes
- Clade: Angiosperms
- Clade: Eudicots
- Clade: Asterids
- Order: Lamiales
- Family: Lentibulariaceae
- Genus: Utricularia
- Subgenus: Utricularia subg. Utricularia
- Section: Utricularia sect. Foliosa; Kamiénski

Type species
- U. amethystina A.St.-Hil. & Girard

Species
- Utricularia amethystina; Utricularia bicolor; Utricularia biceps; Utricularia calycifida; Utricularia chapadensis; Utricularia damazioi; Utricularia hintonii; Utricularia hirtella; Utricularia hispida; Utricularia huntii; Utricularia lindmannii; Utricularia longifolia; Utricularia lunaris; Utricularia panamensis; Utricularia pantaneira; Utricularia petersoniae; Utricularia praelonga; Utricularia regia; Utricularia roraimensis; Utricularia schultesii; Utricularia tricolor; Utricularia tridentata; Utricularia trinervia; Utricularia velascoensis

= Utricularia sect. Foliosa =

Group of carnivorous plants

Utricularia sect. Foliosa is a section in the genus Utricularia. The species in this section are small or medium-sized terrestrial carnivorous plants native to North and South America.

== See also ==
- List of Utricularia species
