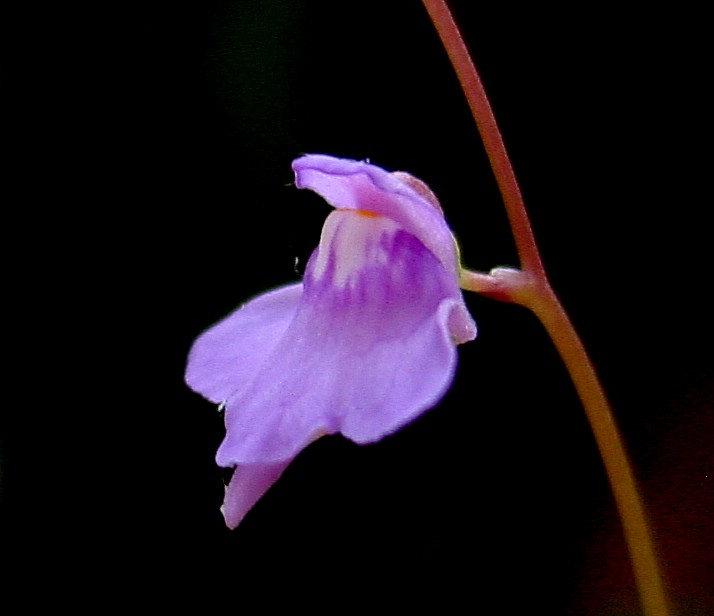

Conservation status
- Least Concern (IUCN 3.1)

Scientific classification
- Kingdom: Plantae
- Clade: Tracheophytes
- Clade: Angiosperms
- Clade: Eudicots
- Clade: Asterids
- Order: Lamiales
- Family: Lentibulariaceae
- Genus: Utricularia
- Subgenus: Utricularia subg. Utricularia
- Section: Utricularia sect. Foliosa
- Species: U. amethystina

Binomial name
- Utricularia amethystina Salzm. ex St.Hil. & Gir.

= Utricularia amethystina =

Species of plant

Utricularia amethystina, the Florida purple bladderwort, is a variable species of terrestrial bladderwort native to Bolivia, Brazil, Guyana, Peru, and south-west Florida. The small flowers can be purple, lilac, white, bluish, cream, or bright yellow, and are also highly variable in size and shape.

== See also ==
- List of Utricularia species
