= Utricularia purpureocaerulea =

Scientific classification
- Kingdom: Plantae
- Clade: Tracheophytes
- Clade: Angiosperms
- Clade: Eudicots
- Clade: Asterids
- Order: Lamiales
- Family: Lentibulariaceae
- Genus: Utricularia
- Subgenus: Utricularia subg. Bivalvaria
- Section: Utricularia sect. Aranella
- Species: U. purpureocaerulea

Binomial name
- Utricularia purpureocaerulea A.St.-Hil. & Girard

Synonyms
- U. goebelii Merl ex Luetzelb.

Species of carnivorous plant

Utricularia purpureocaerulea is a small, probably perennial, carnivorous plant that belongs to the genus Utricularia. U. purpureocaerulea is endemic to the Brazilian states of Bahia, Goiás, and Minas Gerais and is only known from six collections in these locations. It grows as a terrestrial plant in damp, sandy soils among rocks at elevations from 1,000 m (3,281 ft) to 1,600 m (5,249 ft). U. purpureocaerulea was originally described and published by Augustin Saint-Hilaire and Frédéric de Girard in 1838.

== See also ==
- List of Utricularia species
