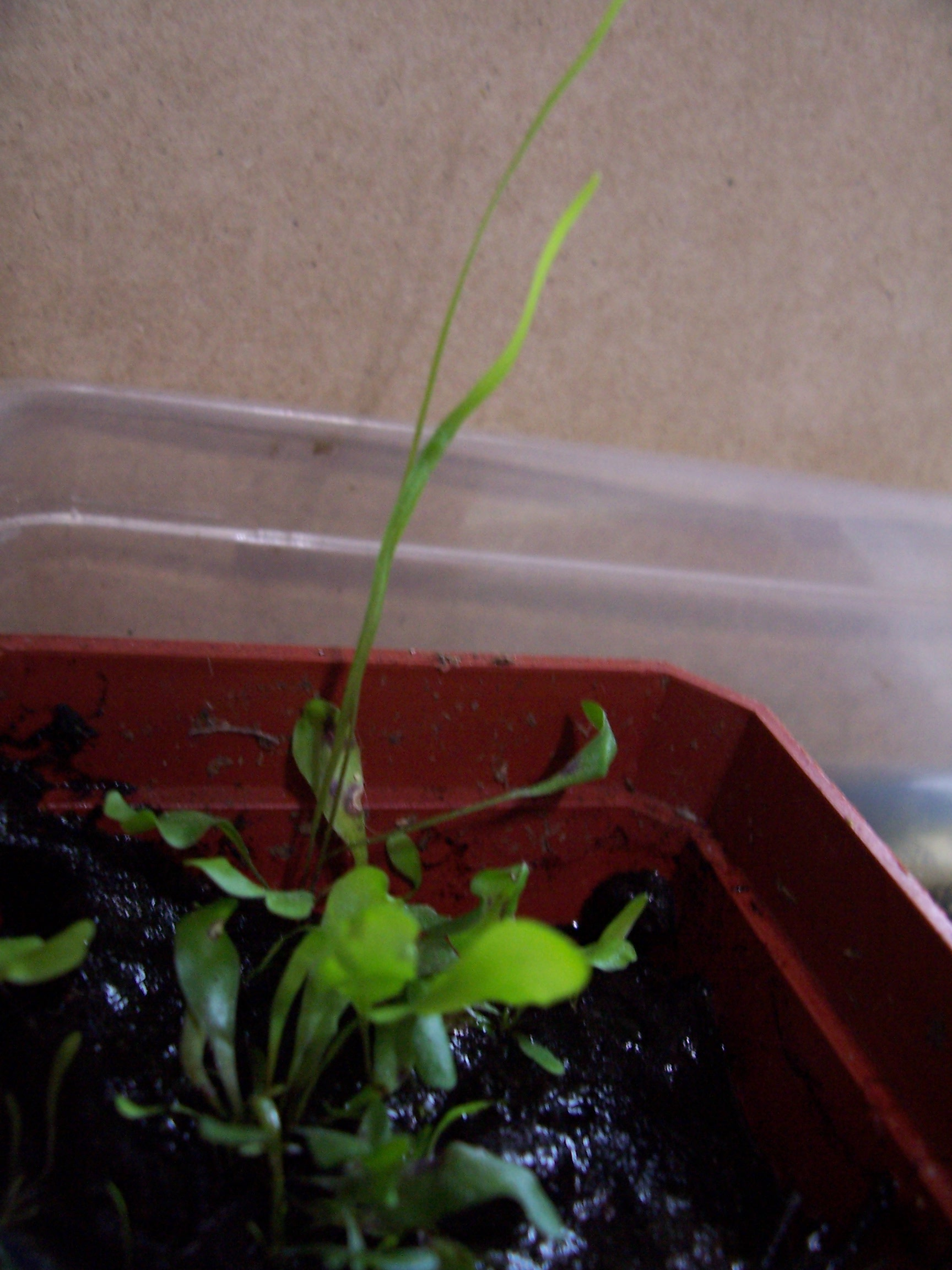

Scientific classification
- Kingdom: Plantae
- Clade: Tracheophytes
- Clade: Angiosperms
- Clade: Eudicots
- Clade: Asterids
- Order: Lamiales
- Family: Lentibulariaceae
- Genus: Utricularia
- Subgenus: Utricularia subg. Utricularia
- Section: Utricularia sect. Foliosa
- Species: U. praelonga

Binomial name
- Utricularia praelonga A.St.-Hil. & Girard

Synonyms
- Calpidisca lundii (A.DC.) Moldenke; U. dentata Weber ex Benj.; U. lundii A.DC.; U. polyschista Benj.

= Utricularia praelonga =

Species of carnivorous plant

Utricularia praelonga is a medium-sized to large perennial carnivorous plant that belongs to the genus Utricularia. U. praelonga, a terrestrial species, is endemic to South America, where it is found in northern Argentina, southern Brazil, and Paraguay.

== See also ==
- List of Utricularia species
