= Utricularia nephrophylla =

Scientific classification
- Kingdom: Plantae
- Clade: Tracheophytes
- Clade: Angiosperms
- Clade: Eudicots
- Clade: Asterids
- Order: Lamiales
- Family: Lentibulariaceae
- Genus: Utricularia
- Subgenus: Utricularia subg. Utricularia
- Section: Utricularia sect. Orchidioides
- Species: U. nephrophylla

Binomial name
- Utricularia nephrophylla Benj.

Synonyms
- U. dusenii Sylvén; U. dusenii var. corcovadensis Merl ex Luetzelb.

Species of carnivorous plant

Utricularia nephrophylla is a small to medium-sized lithophytic carnivorous plant that belongs to the genus Utricularia. U. nephrophylla is endemic to Brazil. It was originally published and described by Ludwig Benjamin in 1847. Its habitat is reported as being wet, mostly vertical rocks in montane forests at altitudes from 600 m (1,969 ft) to 1,200 m (3,937 ft). It flowers year-round.

== See also ==
- List of Utricularia species
