= Utricularia huntii =

Scientific classification
- Kingdom: Plantae
- Clade: Tracheophytes
- Clade: Angiosperms
- Clade: Eudicots
- Clade: Asterids
- Order: Lamiales
- Family: Lentibulariaceae
- Genus: Utricularia
- Subgenus: Utricularia subg. Utricularia
- Section: Utricularia sect. Foliosa
- Species: U. huntii

Binomial name
- Utricularia huntii P.Taylor

Species of carnivorous plant

Utricularia huntii is a medium-sized perennial terrestrial carnivorous plant that belongs to the genus Utricularia. U. huntii is endemic to Brazil and is only known from five collections. It was originally described by Peter Taylor in 1986 in honor of David Richard Hunt.

== See also ==
- List of Utricularia species
