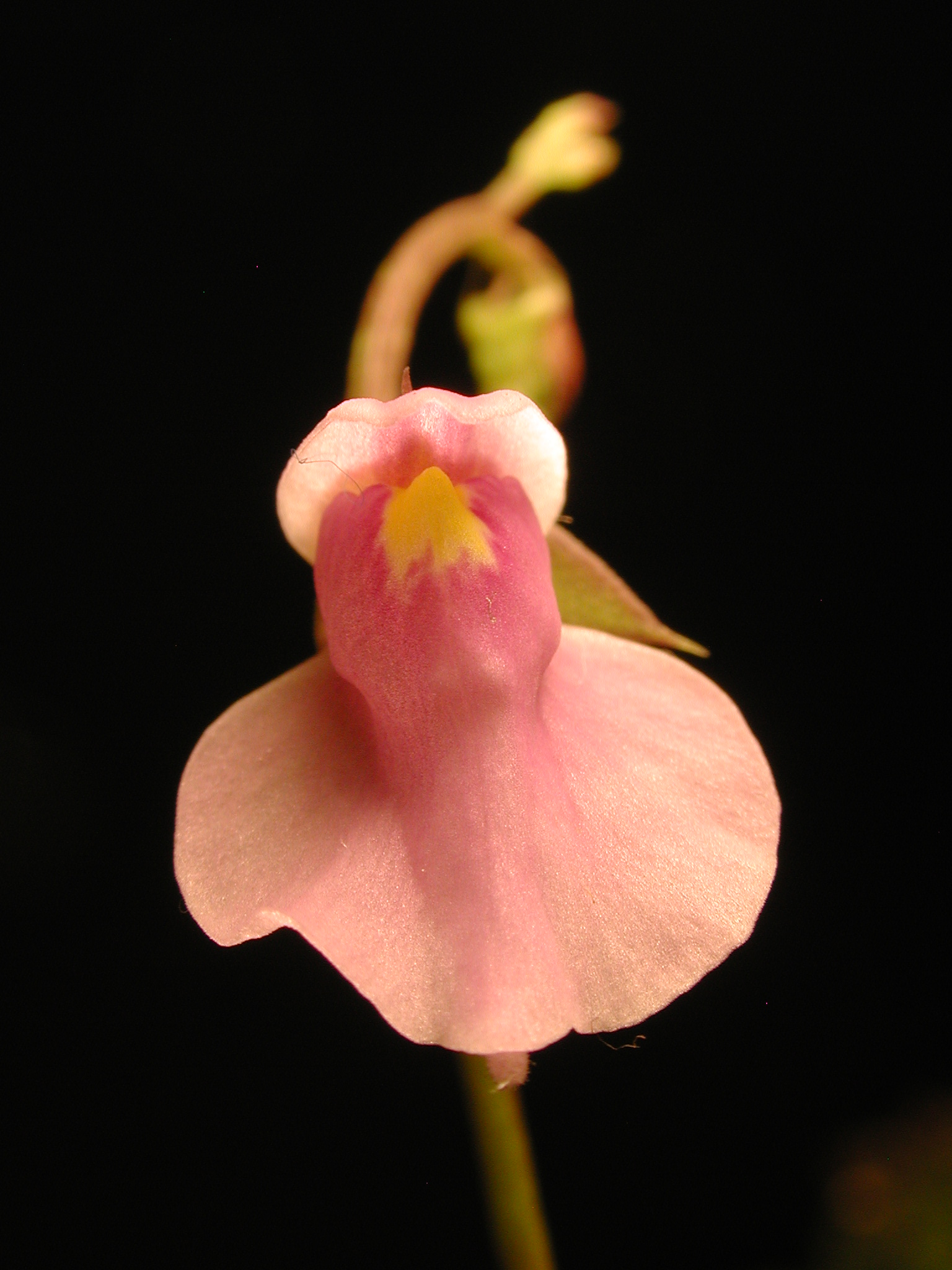

Scientific classification
- Kingdom: Plantae
- Clade: Tracheophytes
- Clade: Angiosperms
- Clade: Eudicots
- Clade: Asterids
- Order: Lamiales
- Family: Lentibulariaceae
- Genus: Utricularia
- Subgenus: Utricularia subg. Utricularia
- Section: Utricularia sect. Foliosa
- Species: U. calycifida

Binomial name
- Utricularia calycifida Benj.

Synonyms
- Calpidisca calycifida (Benj.) Gleason; U. cuspidata Steyerm.; U. maguirei Steyerm.; U. muscosa Benj.

= Utricularia calycifida =

Species of carnivorous plant

Utricularia calycifida is a small to medium-sized terrestrial perennial carnivorous plant that belongs to the genus Utricularia. U. calycifida is endemic to northern South America and can be found in Brazil, Guyana, Suriname, and Venezuela.

Utricularia calycifida is frequently grown by carnivorous plant specialists. Because of its large leaves and variations in flower color and size, several cultivars of this species have been established, e.g. Utricularia 'Lavinia Whateley', U. 'Cthulhu', U. 'Yog-Sothoth', U. 'Mrs. Marsh,' and U. 'Asenath Waite.' These names are based upon characters in the novels and short stories of H. P. Lovecraft.

== See also ==
- List of Utricularia species
