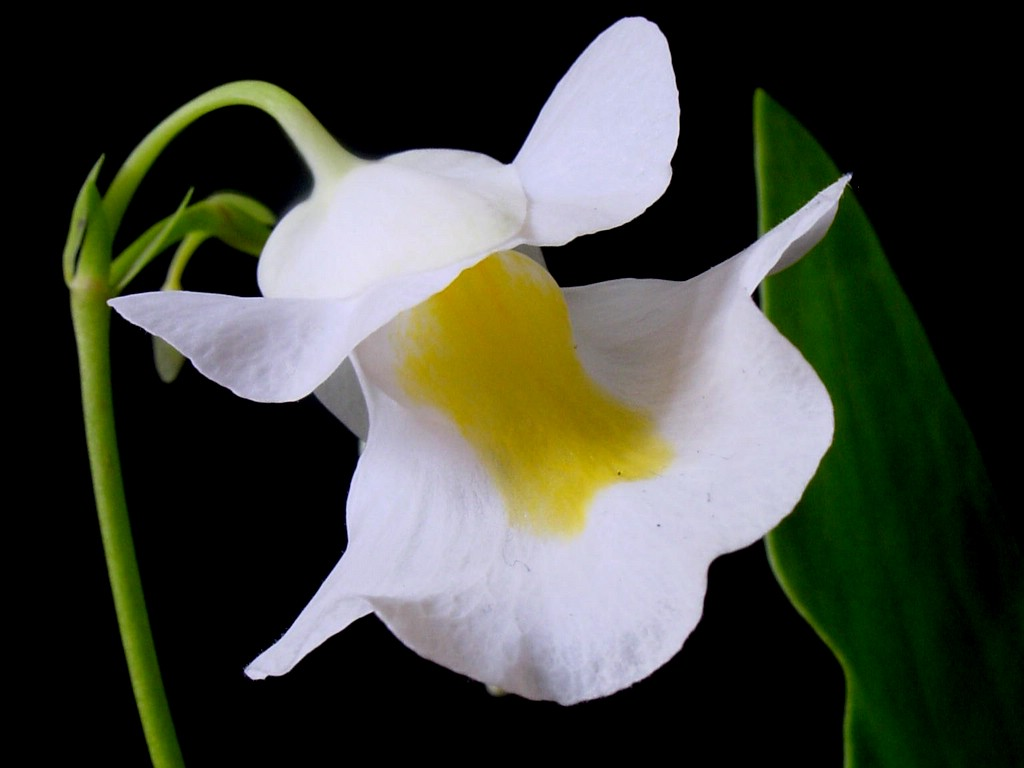

Scientific classification
- Kingdom: Plantae
- Clade: Tracheophytes
- Clade: Angiosperms
- Clade: Eudicots
- Clade: Asterids
- Order: Lamiales
- Family: Lentibulariaceae
- Genus: Utricularia
- Subgenus: Utricularia subg. Utricularia
- Section: Utricularia sect. Orchidioides
- Species: U. alpina

Binomial name
- Utricularia alpina Jacq.

Synonyms
- Orchyllium alpinum (Jacq.) Barnhart; U. grandiflora Pers.; U. montana Jacq.; U. montana Poir.

= Utricularia alpina =

Caribbean Bladderwort

Species of carnivorous plant

Utricularia alpina, the Caribbean bladderwort, is a medium-sized terrestrial or epiphytic, perennial carnivorous plant that belongs to the genus Utricularia. U. alpina is native to the Antilles and northern South America, where it is found in Brazil, Colombia, Guyana, and Venezuela. In the Antilles it can be found in Dominica, Grenada, Guadeloupe, Jamaica, Martinique, Montserrat, Saba, Saint Kitts, Saint Lucia, Saint Vincent, and Trinidad.

== See also ==
- List of Utricularia species
