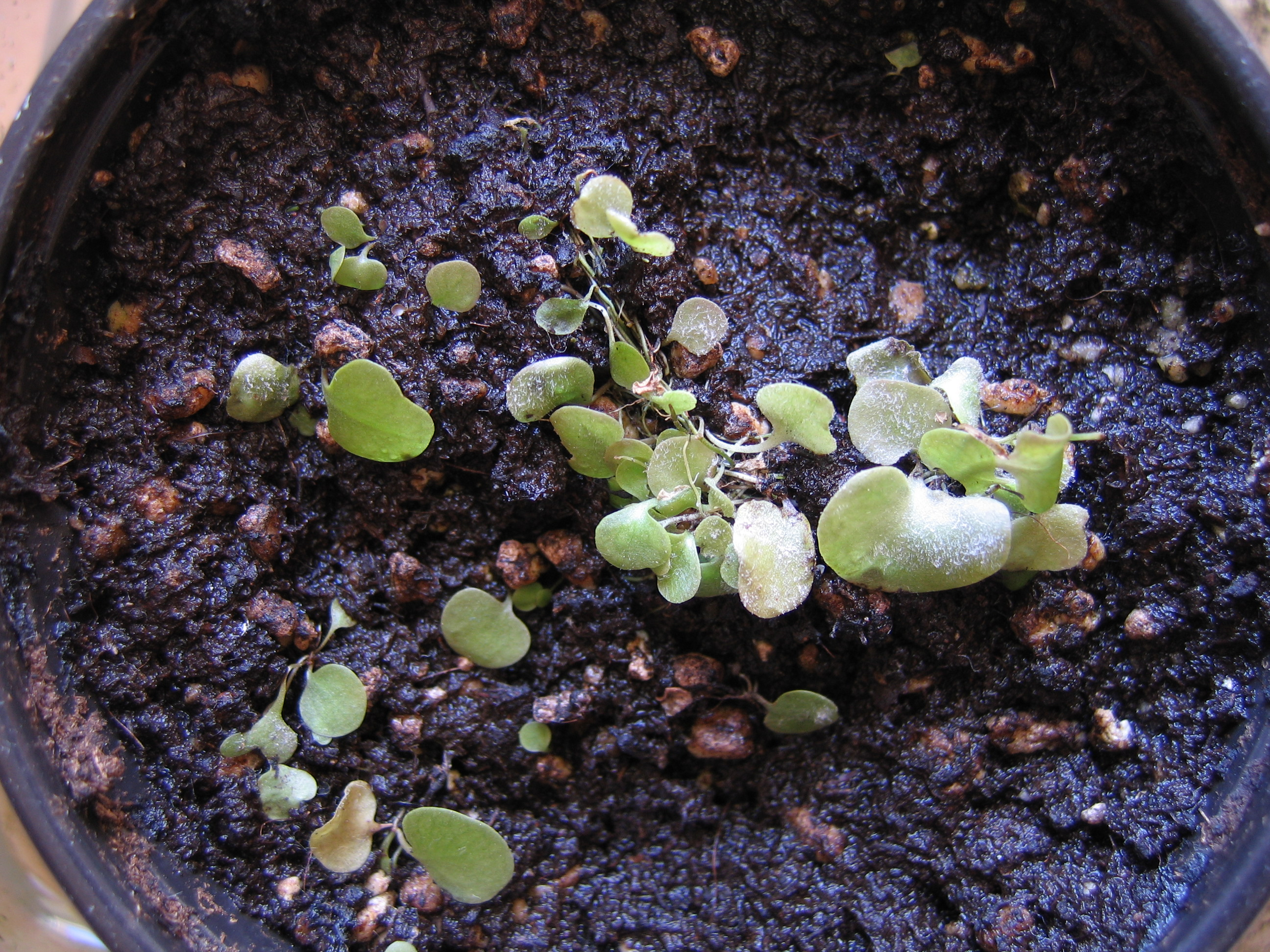

Scientific classification
- Kingdom: Plantae
- Clade: Tracheophytes
- Clade: Angiosperms
- Clade: Eudicots
- Clade: Asterids
- Order: Lamiales
- Family: Lentibulariaceae
- Genus: Utricularia
- Subgenus: Utricularia subg. Utricularia
- Section: Utricularia sect. Foliosa
- Species: U. tricolor

Binomial name
- Utricularia tricolor A.St.-Hil.

Synonyms
- U. chamissonis Weber ex Benj.; U. fontana A.St.-Hil. & Girard; U. fusiformis Warm.; U. globulariifolia Mart. ex Benj.; U. globulariifolia var. caudata Sylvén; U. globulariifolia var. minor Merl ex Luetzelb.; U. gomezii A.DC.; [U. lundii Glaz.]; U. monantha Benj.; U. rotundifolia Merl ex Luetzelb.

= Utricularia tricolor =

Species of carnivorous plant

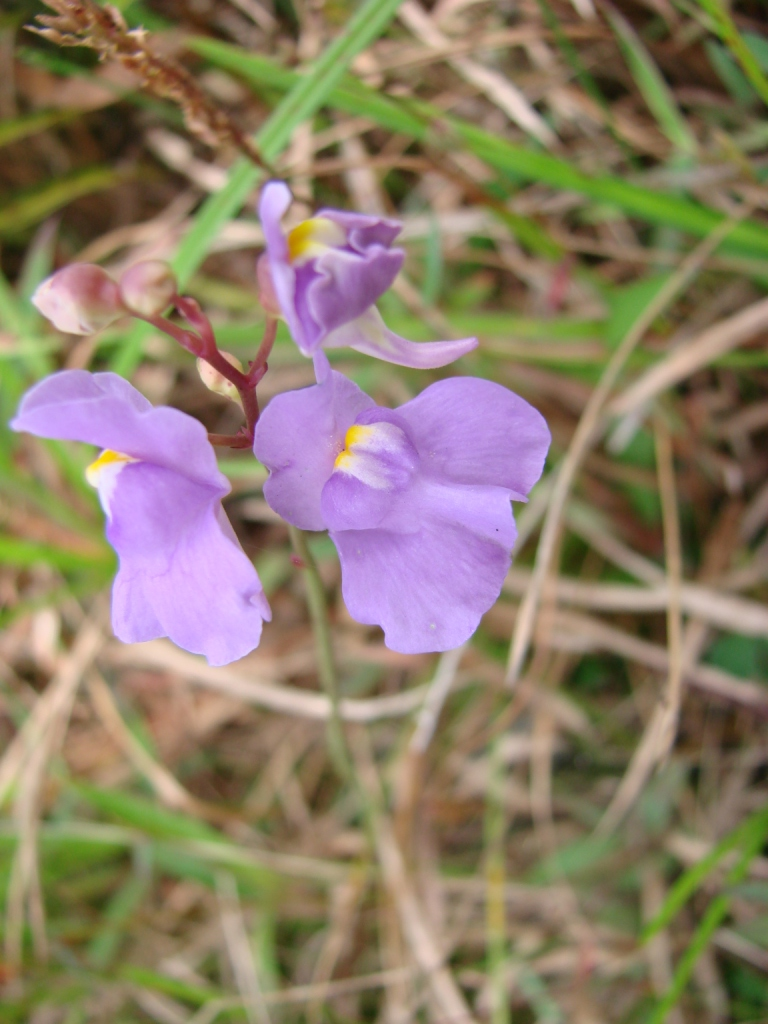
U. tricolor flowers in the wild

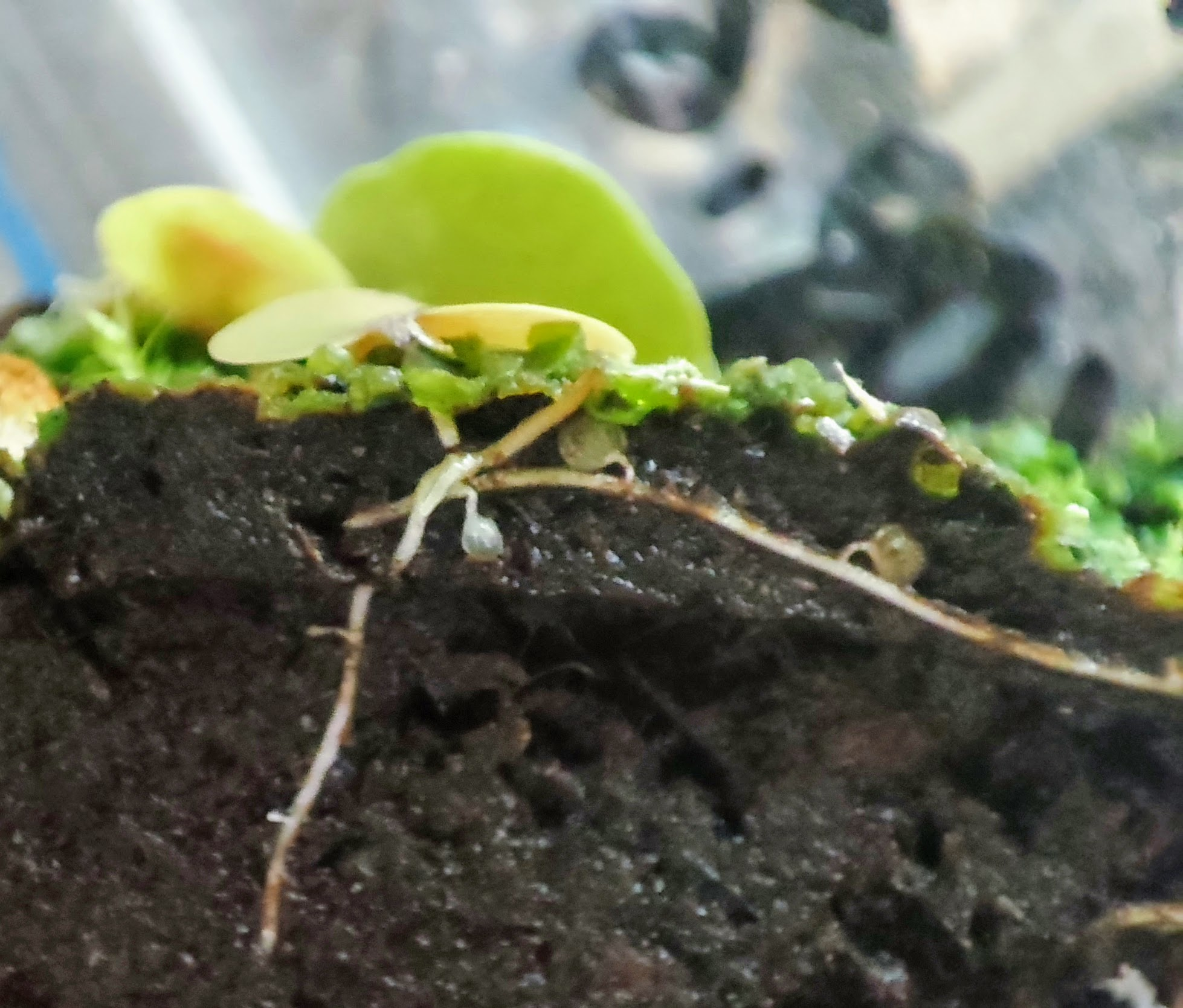
Utricularia tricolor stolons above ground and underground traps (indoor cultivation)

Utricularia tricolor is a medium to large sized perennial carnivorous plant that belongs to the genus Utricularia. U. tricolor, a terrestrial species, is endemic to South America, where it is found in Argentina, Brazil, Bolivia, Colombia, Paraguay, Uruguay, and Venezuela. It has a diploid chromosome number of 2n = 28.

== See also ==
- List of Utricularia species
