= Utricularia schultesii =

Scientific classification
- Kingdom: Plantae
- Clade: Embryophytes
- Clade: Tracheophytes
- Clade: Angiosperms
- Clade: Eudicots
- Clade: Asterids
- Order: Lamiales
- Family: Lentibulariaceae
- Genus: Utricularia
- Subgenus: Utricularia subg. Utricularia
- Section: Utricularia sect. Foliosa
- Species: U. schultesii

Binomial name
- Utricularia schultesii A.Fernández

Species of carnivorous plant

Utricularia schultesii is a small, terrestrial, perennial carnivorous plant that belongs to the genus Utricularia. U. schultesii is endemic to South America, where it is only known from the type location in Colombia and additional collections in Venezuela. It was published and described by Alvaro Fernández-Pérez in 1964.

== See also ==
- List of Utricularia species
