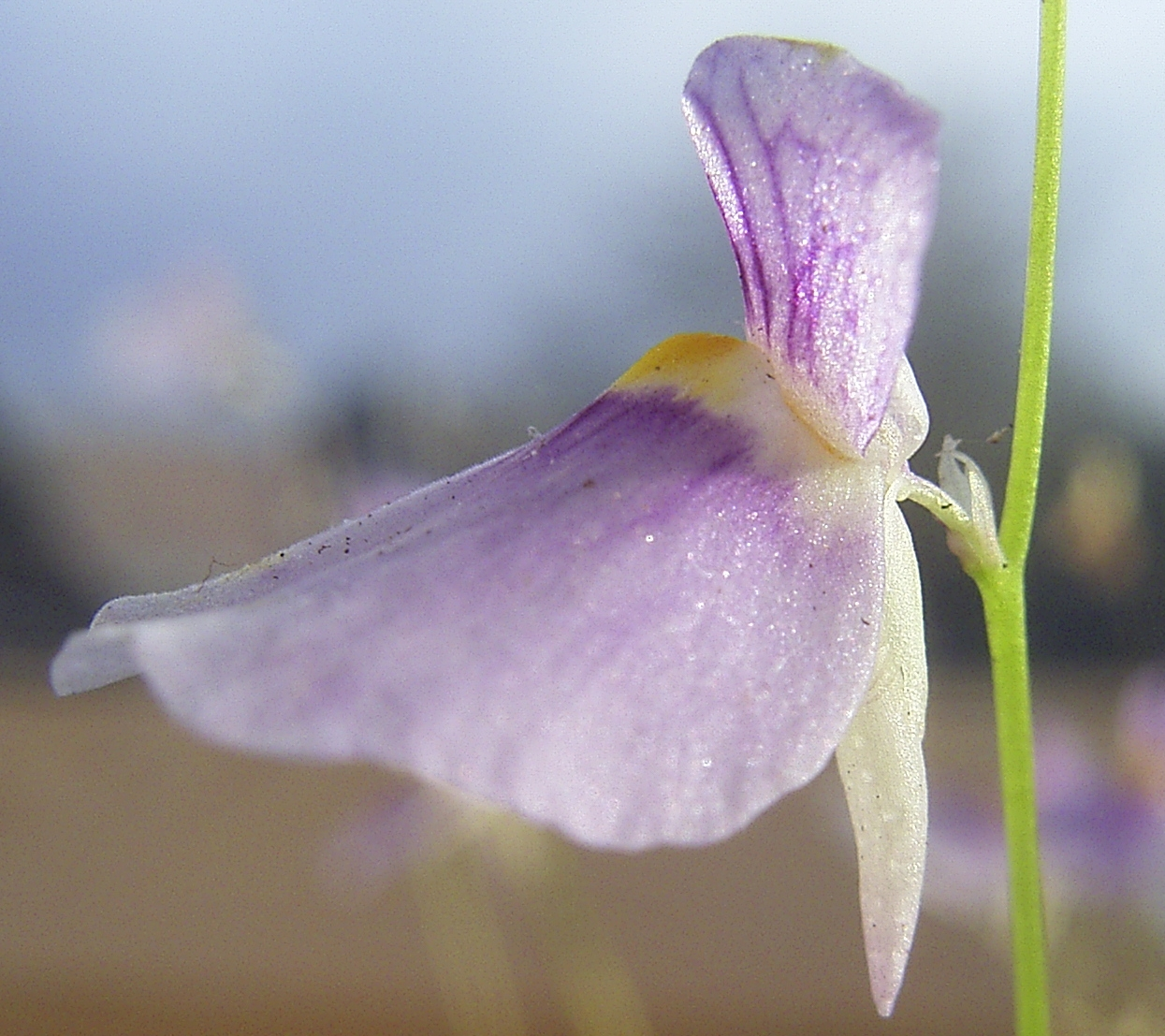

Scientific classification
- Kingdom: Plantae
- Clade: Tracheophytes
- Clade: Angiosperms
- Clade: Eudicots
- Clade: Asterids
- Order: Lamiales
- Family: Lentibulariaceae
- Genus: Utricularia
- Subgenus: Utricularia subg. Bivalvaria
- Section: Utricularia sect. Aranella
- Species: U. blanchetii

Binomial name
- Utricularia blanchetii A.DC.

= Utricularia blanchetii =

Species of carnivorous plant

Utricularia blanchetii is a small, probably annual carnivorous plant that belongs to the genus Utricularia. U. blanchetii is endemic to Brazil and is only known from central Bahia state. It grows as a terrestrial or lithophytic plant in damp, sandy soils among rocks or by streams at altitudes from 850 m (2,789 ft) to 1,750 m (5,741 ft). It was originally described and published by Alphonse Pyrame de Candolle in 1844.

== See also ==
- List of Utricularia species
