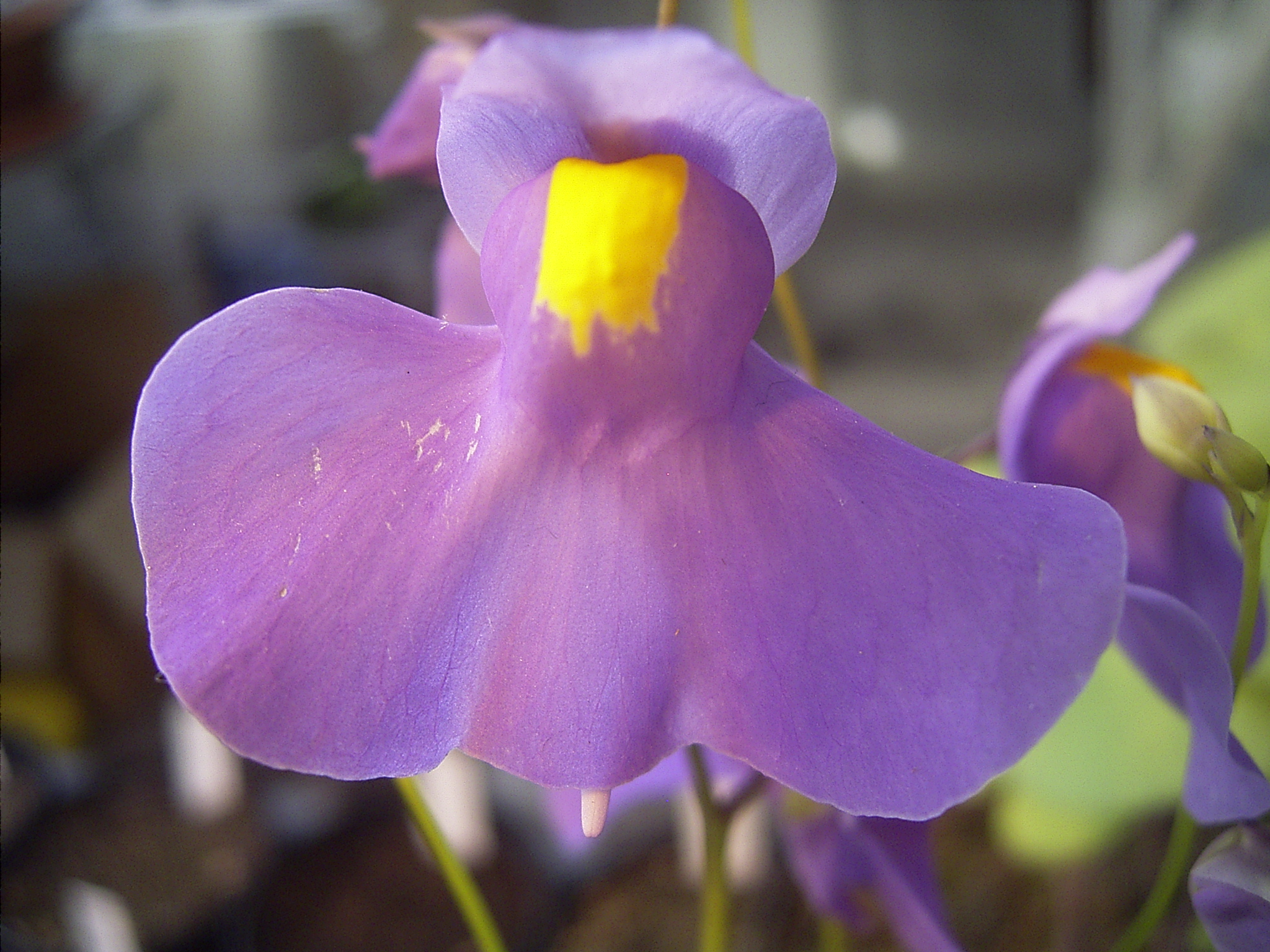

Scientific classification
- Kingdom: Plantae
- Clade: Tracheophytes
- Clade: Angiosperms
- Clade: Eudicots
- Clade: Asterids
- Order: Lamiales
- Family: Lentibulariaceae
- Genus: Utricularia
- Subgenus: Utricularia subg. Utricularia
- Section: Utricularia sect. Foliosa
- Species: U. longifolia

Binomial name
- Utricularia longifolia Gardner

Synonyms
- U. arrojadensis Merl ex Luetzelb.; U. bramadensis Merl ex Luetzelb.; U. forgetiana Sander; U. jaquatibensis Merl ex Luetzelb.; U. longifolia var. paludosa Merl ex Luetzelb.; U. rhyterophylla Sander ex Hogg

= Utricularia longifolia =

Species of carnivorous plant

Utricularia longifolia is a large perennial carnivorous plant that belongs to the genus Utricularia. U. longifolia, a terrestrial or lithophyte species, is endemic to Brazil.

== See also ==
- List of Utricularia species
