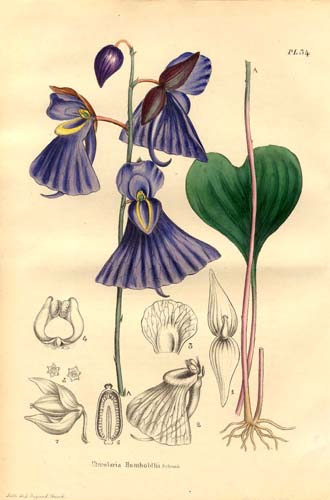

Scientific classification
- Kingdom: Plantae
- Clade: Embryophytes
- Clade: Tracheophytes
- Clade: Angiosperms
- Clade: Eudicots
- Clade: Asterids
- Order: Lamiales
- Family: Lentibulariaceae
- Genus: Utricularia
- Subgenus: Utricularia subg. Utricularia
- Section: Utricularia sect. Orchidioides
- Species: U. humboldtii

Binomial name
- Utricularia humboldtii R.H.Schomb.

Synonyms
- Calpidisca humboldtii (R.H.Schomb.) Gleason; Orchyllium humboldtii (R.H.Schomb.) Barnhart; U. humboldtii f. cuneata Steyerm.

= Utricularia humboldtii =

Species of carnivorous plant

Utricularia humboldtii is a large perennial carnivorous plant that belongs to the genus Utricularia. Peter Taylor lists it as either an "aquatic-epiphyte", a subaquatic or a terrestrial species. U. humboldtii is endemic to South America, where it is found in Brazil, Guyana, and Venezuela. It was originally published and described by Robert Hermann Schomburgk in 1840. It is usually found growing in the water-filled leaf axils of some species of bromeliad, including Brocchinia micrantha, B. tatei, and B. reducta and also plants in the genus Orectanthe. It also grows as an epiphyte on tree trunks or as a subaquatic or terrestrial species in shallow water or wet soil in open savanna. It is found mostly between altitudes of 1,200 m (3,937 ft) and 2,500 m (8,202 ft), though it has been found at altitudes as low as 300 m (984 ft). It has been collected in flower throughout every month of the year.

U. humboldtii possess the largest flower of the genus and most likely also the largest bladder traps. As it usually lives within the water-filled leaf axils of bromeliads, it occasionally needs to search for new pools of water, so it sends out upright stolons that find nearby bromeliads, descend into the water, and grow into a new plant.

== See also ==
- List of Utricularia species
