= Utricularia geminiloba =

Scientific classification
- Kingdom: Plantae
- Clade: Tracheophytes
- Clade: Angiosperms
- Clade: Eudicots
- Clade: Asterids
- Order: Lamiales
- Family: Lentibulariaceae
- Genus: Utricularia
- Subgenus: Utricularia subg. Utricularia
- Section: Utricularia sect. Orchidioides
- Species: U. geminiloba

Binomial name
- Utricularia geminiloba Benj.

Synonyms
- U. itatiaiae Taub.; U. saudadensis Merl ex Luetzelb.; U. triphylla Ule

Species of carnivorous plant

Utricularia geminiloba is a medium-sized perennial lithophyte or terrestrial carnivorous plant that belongs to the genus Utricularia. U. geminiloba is endemic to Brazil. It was originally published and described by Ludwig Benjamin in 1847. The species epithet refers to the two pronounced anterior corolla lobes ("Gemini lobes").

== See also ==
- List of Utricularia species
