= Utricularia sandwithii =

Scientific classification
- Kingdom: Plantae
- Clade: Embryophytes
- Clade: Tracheophytes
- Clade: Angiosperms
- Clade: Eudicots
- Clade: Asterids
- Order: Lamiales
- Family: Lentibulariaceae
- Genus: Utricularia
- Subgenus: Utricularia subg. Bivalvaria
- Section: Utricularia sect. Aranella
- Species: U. sandwithii

Binomial name
- Utricularia sandwithii P.Taylor

Species of carnivorous plant

Utricularia sandwithii is a small, probably perennial, carnivorous plant that belongs to the genus Utricularia. U. sandwithii is endemic to Brazil, Guyana, Suriname, and Venezuela. It grows as a terrestrial plant in damp, sandy soils in savannas at altitudes from near sea level to 600 m (1,969 ft). U. sandwithii was originally described and published by Peter Taylor in 1967 for the Botany of the Guyana Highland series, though it was probably collected as early as 1851 by Heinrich Wullschlägel in Suriname. It had also been collected by George Samuel Jenman in 1881 in Guyana, but was overlooked until Taylor presented his work in 1967.

== See also ==
- List of Utricularia species
