= Utricularia panamensis =

Scientific classification
- Kingdom: Plantae
- Clade: Tracheophytes
- Clade: Angiosperms
- Clade: Eudicots
- Clade: Asterids
- Order: Lamiales
- Family: Lentibulariaceae
- Genus: Utricularia
- Subgenus: Utricularia subg. Utricularia
- Section: Utricularia sect. Foliosa
- Species: U. panamensis

Binomial name
- Utricularia panamensis Steyerm. ex P.Taylor

Species of carnivorous plant

Utricularia panamensis is a small carnivorous plant that belongs to the genus Utricularia. U. panamensis, a lithophyte, is endemic to Panama and is only known from the type location and other collections in the same area. It was first described by Peter Taylor in 1977 as Utricularia sp. and later published as U. panamensis in 1986.

== See also ==
- List of Utricularia species
