= Utricularia laciniata =

Scientific classification
- Kingdom: Plantae
- Clade: Tracheophytes
- Clade: Angiosperms
- Clade: Eudicots
- Clade: Asterids
- Order: Lamiales
- Family: Lentibulariaceae
- Genus: Utricularia
- Subgenus: Utricularia subg. Bivalvaria
- Section: Utricularia sect. Aranella
- Species: U. laciniata

Binomial name
- Utricularia laciniata A.St.-Hil. & Girard

Species of carnivorous plant

Utricularia laciniata is a small, probably annual, carnivorous plant that belongs to the genus Utricularia. U. laciniata is endemic to Brazil, where it is only known from Goiás and Minas Gerais. It grows as a terrestrial plant in damp, sandy or gravelly soils at elevations from 1,000 m (3,281 ft) to 1,300 m (4,265 ft). It flowers between January and May in its native range. U. laciniata was originally described and published by Augustin Saint-Hilaire and Frédéric de Girard in 1838.

== See also ==
- List of Utricularia species
