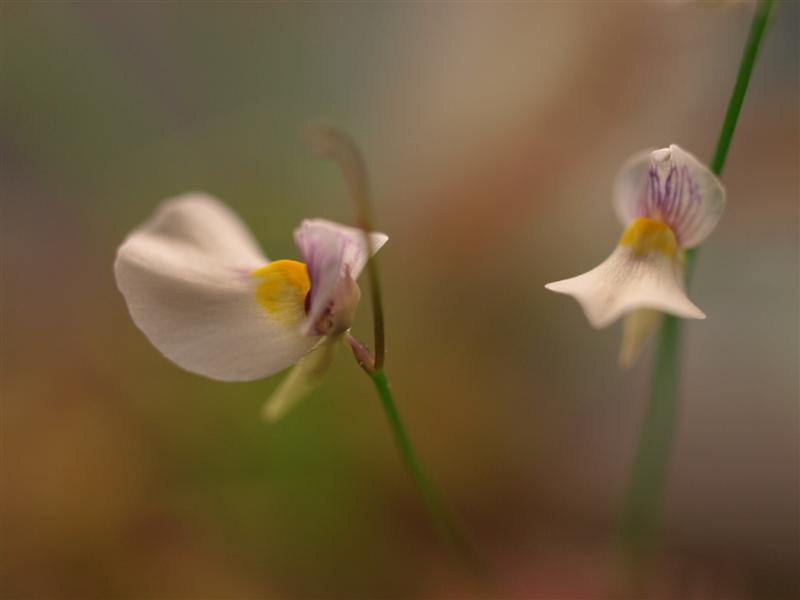

Scientific classification
- Kingdom: Plantae
- Clade: Tracheophytes
- Clade: Angiosperms
- Clade: Eudicots
- Clade: Asterids
- Order: Lamiales
- Family: Lentibulariaceae
- Genus: Utricularia
- Subgenus: Utricularia subg. Bivalvaria
- Section: Utricularia sect. Aranella
- Species: U. parthenopipes

Binomial name
- Utricularia parthenopipes P.Taylor

= Utricularia parthenopipes =

Species of carnivorous plant

Utricularia parthenopipes is a small annual carnivorous plant that belongs to the genus Utricularia and is endemic to the Brazilian state of Bahia. It grows as a terrestrial plant in damp, sandy soils over sandstone rocks at altitudes from 500 m (1,640 ft) to 1,500 m (4,921 ft) and flowers between January and June in its native range. It was originally described and published by Peter Taylor in 1986.

== See also ==
- List of Utricularia species
