= Utricularia costata =

Scientific classification
- Kingdom: Plantae
- Clade: Embryophytes
- Clade: Tracheophytes
- Clade: Angiosperms
- Clade: Eudicots
- Clade: Asterids
- Order: Lamiales
- Family: Lentibulariaceae
- Genus: Utricularia
- Subgenus: Utricularia subg. Bivalvaria
- Section: Utricularia sect. Aranella
- Species: U. costata

Binomial name
- Utricularia costata P.Taylor

Species of carnivorous plant

Utricularia costata is a small, probably annual carnivorous plant that belongs to the genus Utricularia. U. costata is endemic to Brazil and Venezuela. It grows as a terrestrial or lithophytic plant in damp soils among rocks in savannas. It was originally described and published by Peter Taylor in 1986.

== See also ==
- List of Utricularia species
