= Utricularia petersoniae =

Scientific classification
- Kingdom: Plantae
- Clade: Tracheophytes
- Clade: Angiosperms
- Clade: Eudicots
- Clade: Asterids
- Order: Lamiales
- Family: Lentibulariaceae
- Genus: Utricularia
- Subgenus: Utricularia subg. Utricularia
- Section: Utricularia sect. Foliosa
- Species: U. petersoniae

Binomial name
- Utricularia petersoniae P.Taylor

Species of carnivorous plant

Utricularia petersoniae is a small annual carnivorous plant that belongs to the genus Utricularia. U. petersoniae, a lithophyte, is endemic to the Mexican state of Guerrero. It was first published and described by Peter Taylor in 1986. It is named in honor of Kathleen M. Peterson, one of the collectors who first discovered this species.

== See also ==
- List of Utricularia species
