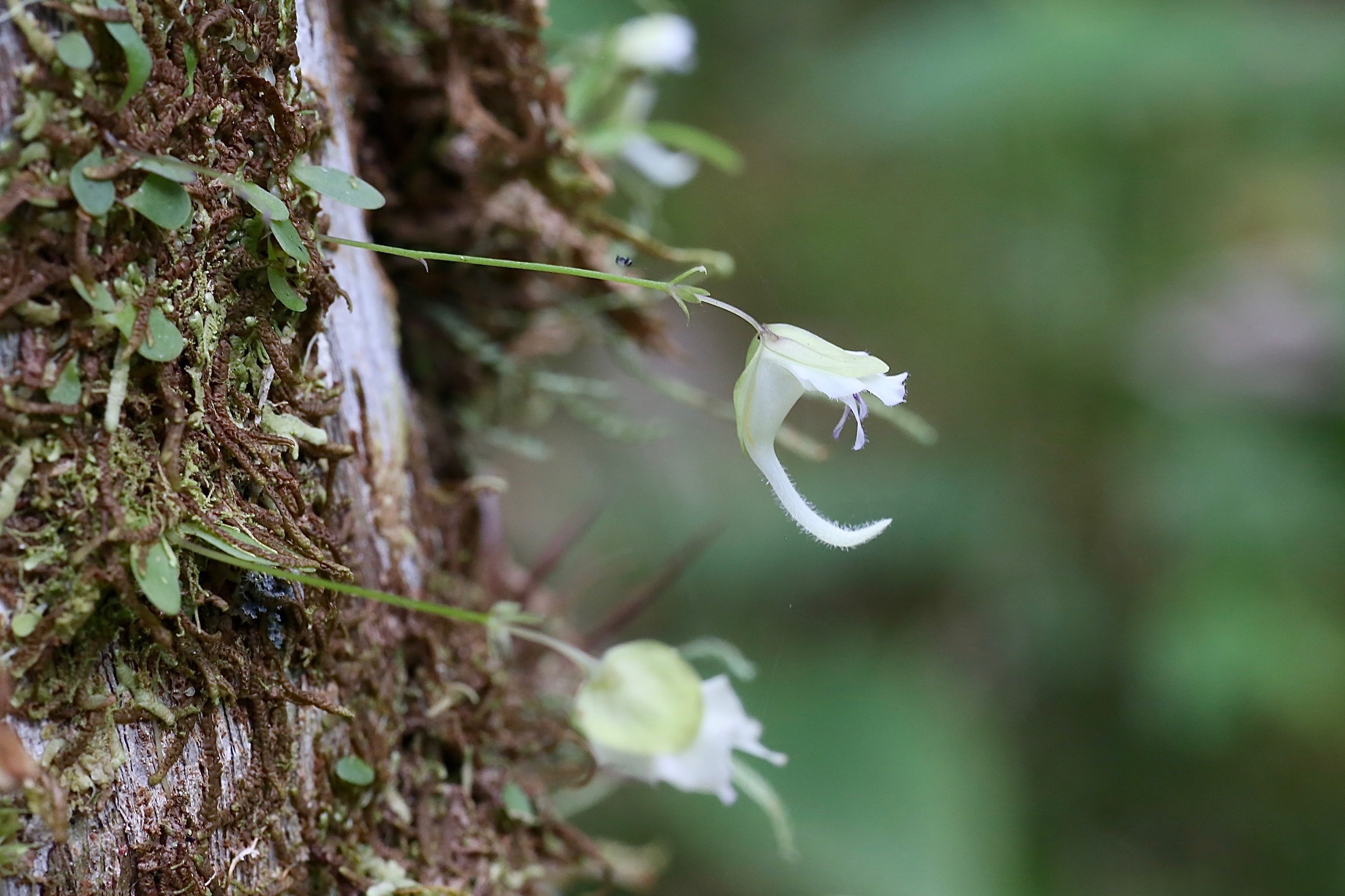
- At Puyo, Ecuador

Conservation status
- Least Concern (IUCN 3.1)

Scientific classification
- Kingdom: Plantae
- Clade: Tracheophytes
- Clade: Angiosperms
- Clade: Eudicots
- Clade: Asterids
- Order: Lamiales
- Family: Lentibulariaceae
- Genus: Utricularia
- Subgenus: Utricularia subg. Utricularia
- Section: Utricularia sect. Orchidioides
- Species: U. jamesoniana

Binomial name
- Utricularia jamesoniana Oliv.

Synonyms
- Orchyllium schimperi (Schenck) Barnhart; U. concinna N.E.Br.; U. schimperi Schenck; U. verapazensis Morong ex Donn.Sm.

= Utricularia jamesoniana =

Species of plant

Utricularia jamesoniana is a small perennial epiphyte carnivorous plant in the family Lentibulariaceae. It is native to Central America, the Antilles, and northern and western South America. Specifically, it can be found in Bolivia, Brazil, Colombia, Costa Rica, Ecuador, French Guiana, Guatemala, Guyana, Nicaragua, Panama, Peru, Suriname, and Venezuela and on the islands of Guadeloupe, Hispaniola, Dominica, and Martinique. The species was originally published and described by Daniel Oliver in 1860. Its habitat is reported as being mossy tree trunks in montane cloud forests or lowland rain forests at altitudes from sea level to 2,500 m (8,202 ft). It flowers year-round.

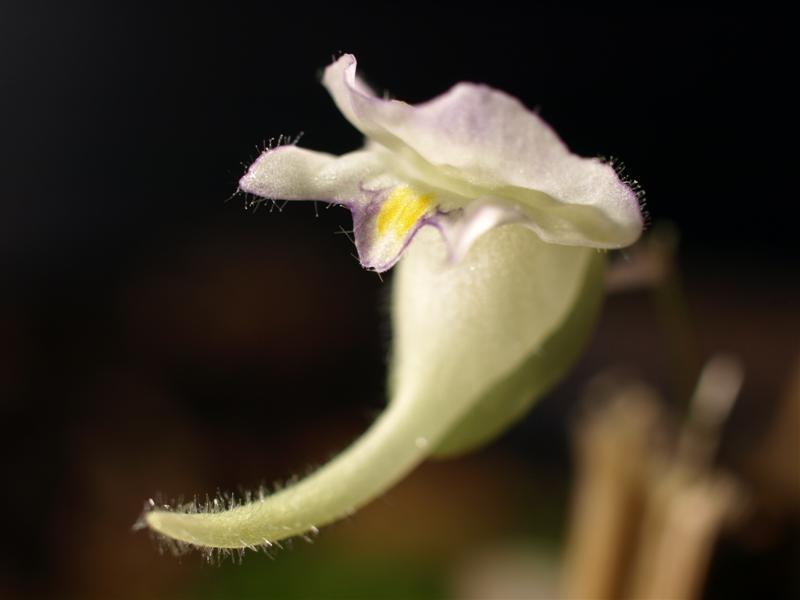
Flower

== See also ==
- List of Utricularia species
