= Utricularia praetermissa =

Scientific classification
- Kingdom: Plantae
- Clade: Tracheophytes
- Clade: Angiosperms
- Clade: Eudicots
- Clade: Asterids
- Order: Lamiales
- Family: Lentibulariaceae
- Genus: Utricularia
- Subgenus: Utricularia subg. Utricularia
- Section: Utricularia sect. Orchidioides
- Species: U. praetermissa

Binomial name
- Utricularia praetermissa P.Taylor

Synonyms
- [U. endresii Donn.Sm.]

Species of carnivorous plant

Utricularia praetermissa is a medium-sized epiphyte or terrestrial carnivorous plant that belongs to the genus Utricularia. U. praetermissa is endemic to Central America, where it is found in Costa Rica, Nicaragua, and Panama. It was originally published and described by Peter Taylor in 1977. It grows on wet trees and banks in cloud forests at altitudes from 1,000 m (3,281 ft) to 2,800 m (9,186 ft). It flowers between July and October.

== See also ==
- List of Utricularia species
