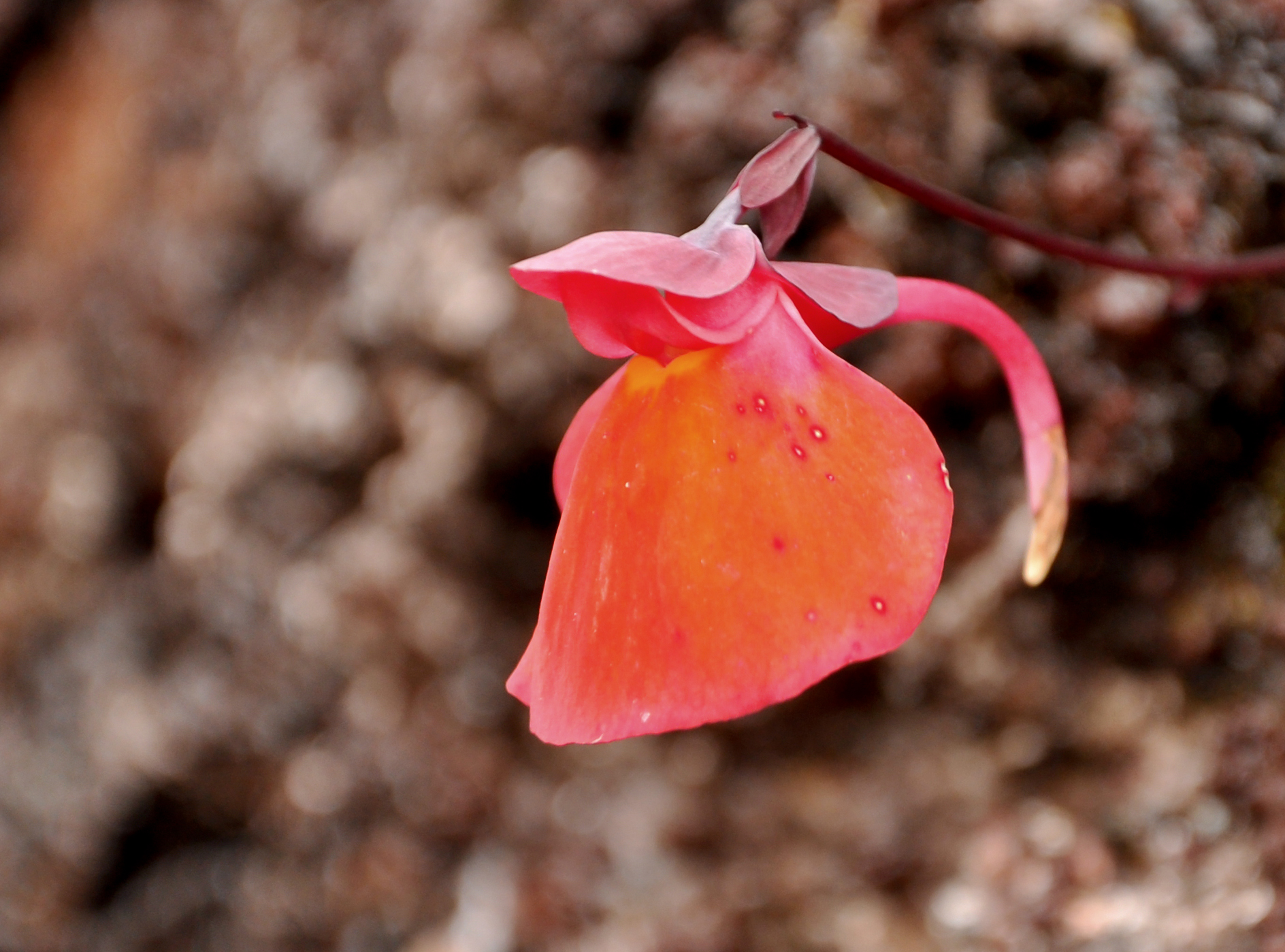

Scientific classification
- Kingdom: Plantae
- Clade: Tracheophytes
- Clade: Angiosperms
- Clade: Eudicots
- Clade: Asterids
- Order: Lamiales
- Family: Lentibulariaceae
- Genus: Utricularia
- Subgenus: Utricularia subg. Utricularia
- Section: Utricularia sect. Orchidioides
- Species: U. quelchii

Binomial name
- Utricularia quelchii N.E.Br.

Synonyms
- Orchyllium quelchii (N.E.Br.) Gleason

= Utricularia quelchii =

Species of carnivorous plant

Utricularia quelchii is a small perennial, epiphyte or terrestrial carnivorous plant that belongs to the genus Utricularia. U. quelchii is endemic to the Guyana Highland region of Guyana and Venezuela with one collection from Brazil. It was originally published and described by N. E. Brown in 1901. It grows on wet, mossy rocks or banks in swamps and around low tree trunks and branches and sometimes in the water-filled leaf axils of the bromeliad Brocchinia species. It is typically found at altitudes around 2,000 m (6,562 ft), but has been recorded from altitudes of 1,400 m (4,593 ft) to 2,800 m (9,186 ft), the highest collections representing specimens from Roraima.

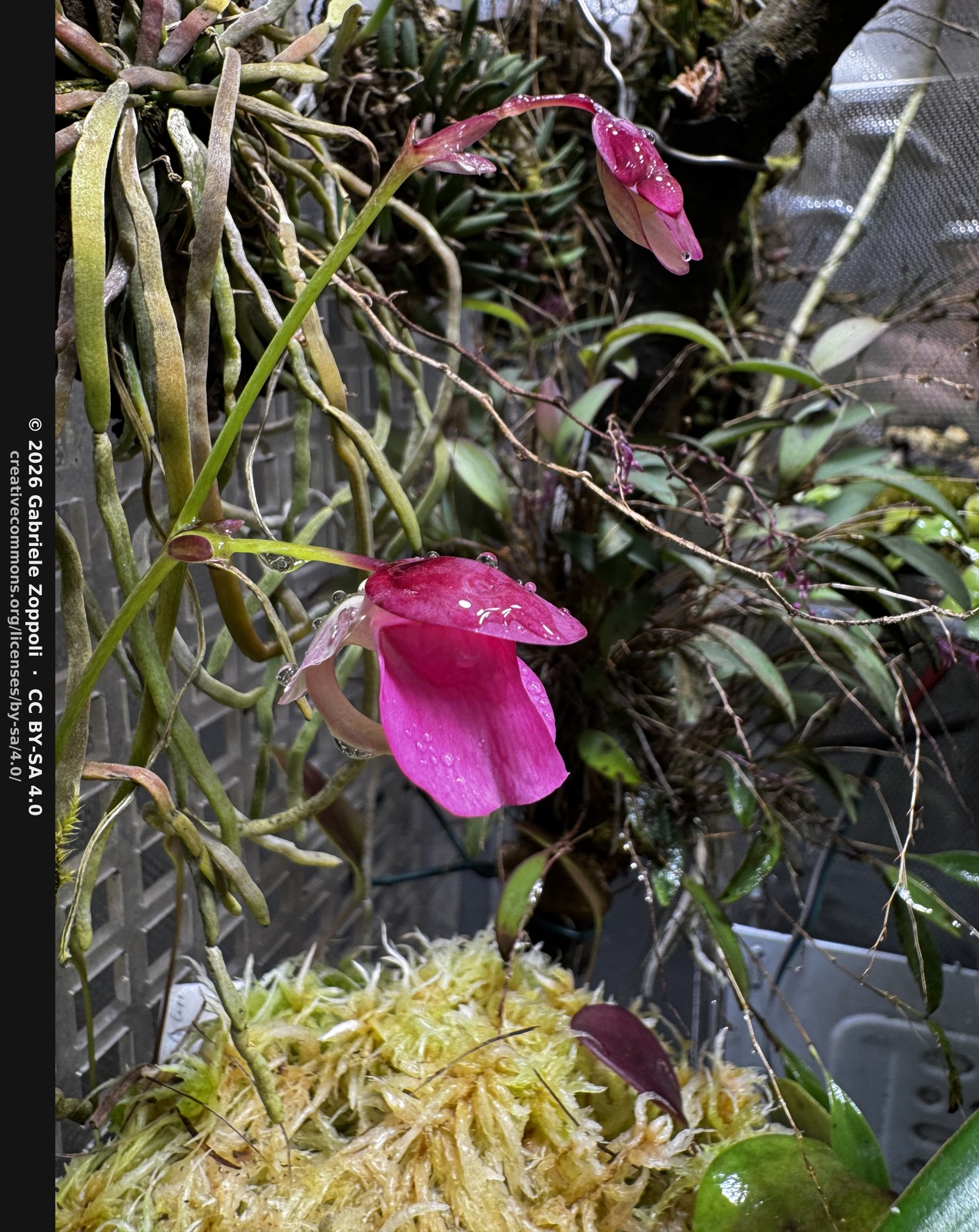
Cultivated specimen of U. quelchii from Ilu Tepui (Bolívar, Venezuela), with two open flowers on a single scape.

== See also ==
- List of Utricularia species
