= Utricularia hintonii =

Scientific classification
- Kingdom: Plantae
- Clade: Tracheophytes
- Clade: Angiosperms
- Clade: Eudicots
- Clade: Asterids
- Order: Lamiales
- Family: Lentibulariaceae
- Genus: Utricularia
- Subgenus: Utricularia subg. Utricularia
- Section: Utricularia sect. Foliosa
- Species: U. hintonii

Binomial name
- Utricularia hintonii P.Taylor

Species of carnivorous plant

Utricularia hintonii is a small terrestrial carnivorous plant that belongs to the genus Utricularia. U. hintonii is an annual lithophyte that is endemic to Mexico and is only known from the type location about 160 kilometres (160,000.0 m) west-southwest of Mexico City. It was originally collected by G. B. Hinton on June 10, 1933, and described as a new species by Peter Taylor in 1986, who named it in honor of Hinton.

== See also ==
- List of Utricularia species
