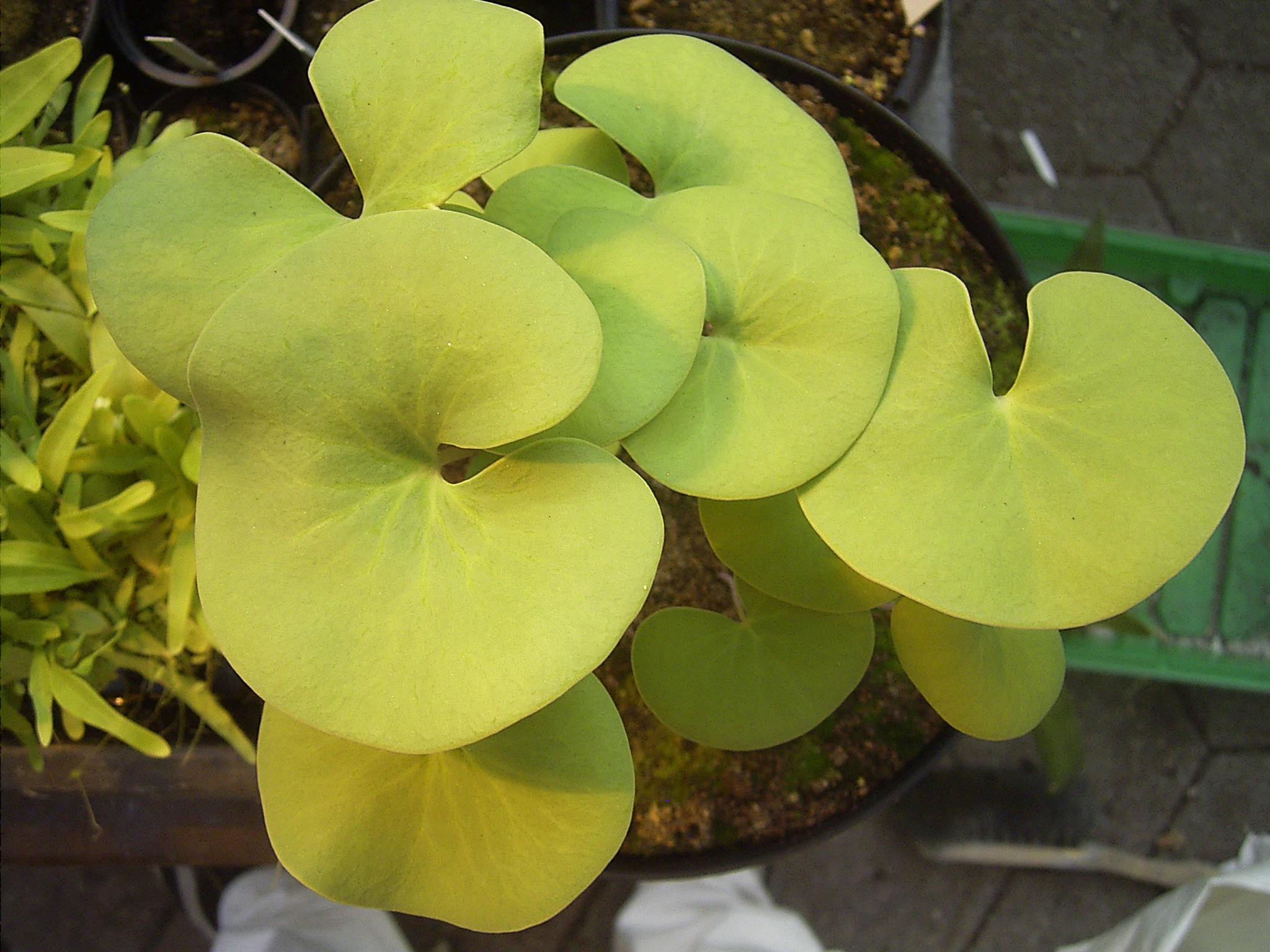

Scientific classification
- Kingdom: Plantae
- Clade: Tracheophytes
- Clade: Angiosperms
- Clade: Eudicots
- Clade: Asterids
- Order: Lamiales
- Family: Lentibulariaceae
- Genus: Utricularia
- Subgenus: Utricularia subg. Utricularia
- Section: Utricularia sect. Orchidioides
- Species: U. reniformis

Binomial name
- Utricularia reniformis A.St.-Hil.

Synonyms
- U. ianthina Hook.f.; U. maxima Weber ex Benj.; U. nelumbifolia var. macahensis Fromm; U. reniformis var. kromeri Ule; U. reniformis f. minor Luetzelb.

= Utricularia reniformis =

Species of carnivorous plant

Utricularia reniformis is a large perennial carnivorous plant that belongs to the Bladderwort genus Utricularia of the family Lentibulariaceae. U. reniformis is endemic to Brazil. It was originally published and described by Augustin Saint-Hilaire in 1830. It usually grows as a terrestrial plant in wet grasslands and only sometimes as an epiphyte in the water-filled leaf axils of some bromeliad species. It is typically found between altitudes of 750 m (2,461 ft) and 1,900 m (6,234 ft) in its southern range and up to 2,500 m (8,202 ft) in its northern range. It has been collected in flower between October and March.

== Description ==
The foliage leaves are kidney-shaped (like Dichondra) and about 7 cm (2.8 in) wide. The ingenious trap leaves grow out of the succulent white rhizome and remain below the surface of the soil or mulch. The two to five zygomorphic flowers are on an upright raceme and have two vertical gold stripes edged with purple on the upper half of the corolla.

== See also ==
- List of Utricularia species
