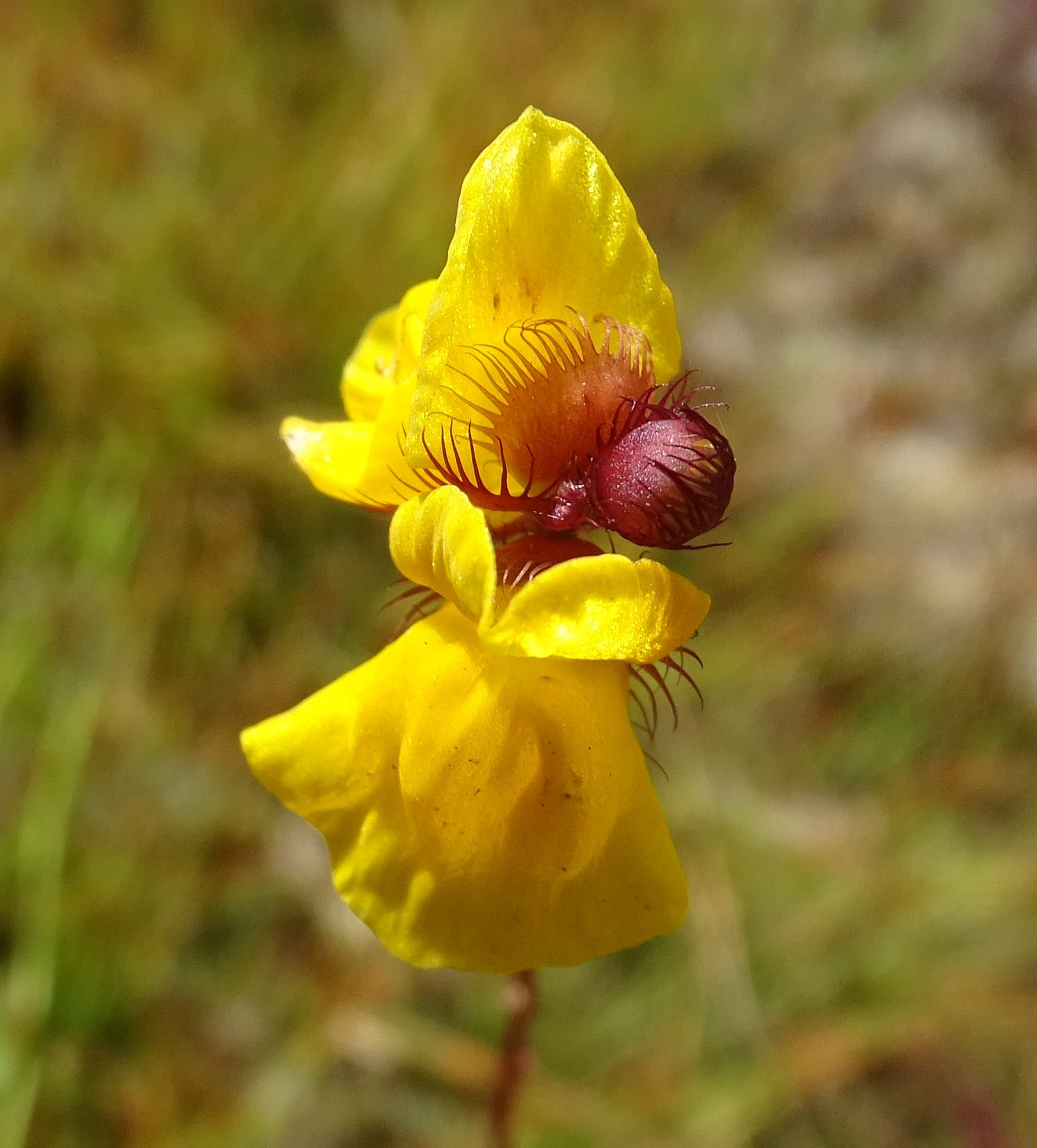

Scientific classification
- Kingdom: Plantae
- Clade: Embryophytes
- Clade: Tracheophytes
- Clade: Angiosperms
- Clade: Eudicots
- Clade: Asterids
- Order: Lamiales
- Family: Lentibulariaceae
- Genus: Utricularia
- Subgenus: Utricularia subg. Bivalvaria
- Section: Utricularia sect. Aranella
- Species: U. simulans

Binomial name
- Utricularia simulans Pilg.

Synonyms
- List: Polypompholyx bicolor Klotzsch; Polypompholyx laciniata var. rubrocalcarata Griseb.; Utricularia congesta Steyerm.; Utricularia congesta f. deminutiva Steyerm.; Utricularia laciniata var. poeppigiana Buscal.; Utricularia orinocensis Steyerm.; Utricularia surinamensis Buscal.

= Utricularia simulans =

Species of carnivorous plant

Utricularia simulans, the fringed bladderwort, is a small to medium-sized, probably perennial, species of carnivorous plant in the family Lentibulariaceae. Utricularia simulans is native to tropical Africa and the Americas. It grows as a terrestrial plant in damp, sandy soils in open savanna at altitudes from near sea level to 1,575 m (5,167 ft). U. simulans was originally described and published by Robert Knud Friedrich Pilger in 1914.
