= Utricularia longeciliata =

Scientific classification
- Kingdom: Plantae
- Clade: Embryophytes
- Clade: Tracheophytes
- Clade: Angiosperms
- Clade: Eudicots
- Clade: Asterids
- Order: Lamiales
- Family: Lentibulariaceae
- Genus: Utricularia
- Subgenus: Utricularia subg. Bivalvaria
- Section: Utricularia sect. Aranella
- Species: U. longeciliata

Binomial name
- Utricularia longeciliata A.DC.

Synonyms
- [Aranella fimbriata Gleason]; Cosmiza longeciliata (A.DC.) Small; Polypompholyx laciniata Benj.; P. longeciliata (A.DC.) L.B.Sm.; P. schomburgkii Klotzsch; Utricularia pectinata Splitg. ex de Vries

Species of carnivorous plant

Utricularia longeciliata is a small to medium-sized perennial carnivorous plant that belongs to the genus Utricularia. U. longeciliata is endemic to South America, where it can be found in Brazil, Colombia, Guyana, Suriname, and Venezuela. It grows as a terrestrial plant in damp, sandy soils at altitudes from near sea level to 1,400 m (4,593 ft). It flowers throughout the year in its native range. U. longeciliata was originally described and published by Alphonse Pyrame de Candolle in 1844.

== See also ==
- List of Utricularia species
