= John Hendley Barnhart =

American botanist and author (1871–1949)

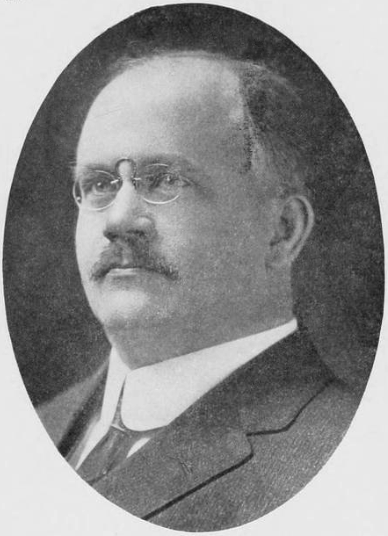
- Born: October 4, 1871; Brooklyn, New York, US
- Died: November 11, 1949 (aged 78); Southampton, New York, US
- Education: Wesleyan University; Columbia University College of Physicians and Surgeons
- Occupations: Botanist, writer
- Spouse: Emma Gertrude Platt (m. 1897)

John Hendley Barnhart (October 4, 1871 – November 11, 1949) was an American botanist and author, specializing in biographies of botanists.

== Early life and education ==
John Barnhart was born in Brooklyn, New York to John Wesley Barnhart and Emma Miller Barnhart. He attended Wesleyan University in Middletown, Connecticut, receiving an A.B. in 1892 and an A.M. the following year. In 1896 he graduated from Columbia University College of Physicians and Surgeons receiving an M.D., though he never practiced medicine. His decision not to practice medicine was apparently made possible by substantial private income.

1897 found him in Jessamine, Florida where he married Emma Gertrude Platt of Southampton, New York. The couple lived in Tarrytown, New York, eventually moving to the Bronx in 1914.

== Career ==
In 1903 he became an editorial assistant at the library of the New York Botanical Garden (NYBG). 1905 saw the first appearance of North American Flora, written by Nathaniel Lord Britton and Lucien Marcus Underwood. Barnhart was responsible for reviews of manuscripts including proof-reading and bibliographic correction. Barnhart developed a style of taxonomic citation, which is still used in the Index to American Botanical Literature.

In 1907 he became NYBG librarian when Anna Murray Vail, its first librarian, retired. From 1908 to 1926, and again in 1932 he was appointed NYBG library vice president. During the 5 years of his tenure as librarian, the number of bound volumes increased by 20%. He also gave his personal library of 1,900 items including many rare volumes.

In January 1913, Barnhart was made Bibliographer of the Garden, a title he would keep for 30 years. His principal responsibility in this capacity was North American Flora. It was during this period that he created the "Barnhart bibliographic file" consisting of about 50,000 cards with bibliographic information and formed the basis of his biographical books.

In 1916, he became one of the two founding editors of the Garden's new botanical journal Addisonia, along with George Valentine Nash.

Barnhart kept a careful record of his own publications, creating a separate card catalog for them. A complete listing of his publications appeared in the Bulletin of the Torrey Botanical Club, volume 77, pages 167–175.

== Final years ==
Barnhart retired from the NYBG in 1942. He died in his home in Southampton, Long Island and was survived by his widow. Interment was in the family plot at Cedar Hill Cemetery in Newburgh, NY.

== Works ==
Selected publications:

- A New Utricularia from Long Island. 1907
- The Published Work of Lucien Marcus Underwood, in Bulletin of the Torrey Botanical Club 35 (1908): 17-38.
- Some American botanists of former days, 1909
- Some Fictitious Botanists, 1919
- "Sartwell, Henry Parker (1792-1867)" in American Medical Biographies, ed. Howard A. Kelly (1920)
- Biographical Notes Upon Botanists. Compiled by John Hendley Barnhart and maintained at the New York Botanical Garden Library, 1965
- Ferns of the Southeastern States. Descriptions of the fern-plants growing naturally in the state south of the Virginia-Kentucky state line and east of the Mississippi river (with John Kunkel Small, 1938)
