= Carnivorous plants of New Zealand =

List of meat-eating plants from New Zealand

There are two native genera of carnivorous plants in New Zealand with fourteen species and four species that have been known to occur in the past.

== Species ==
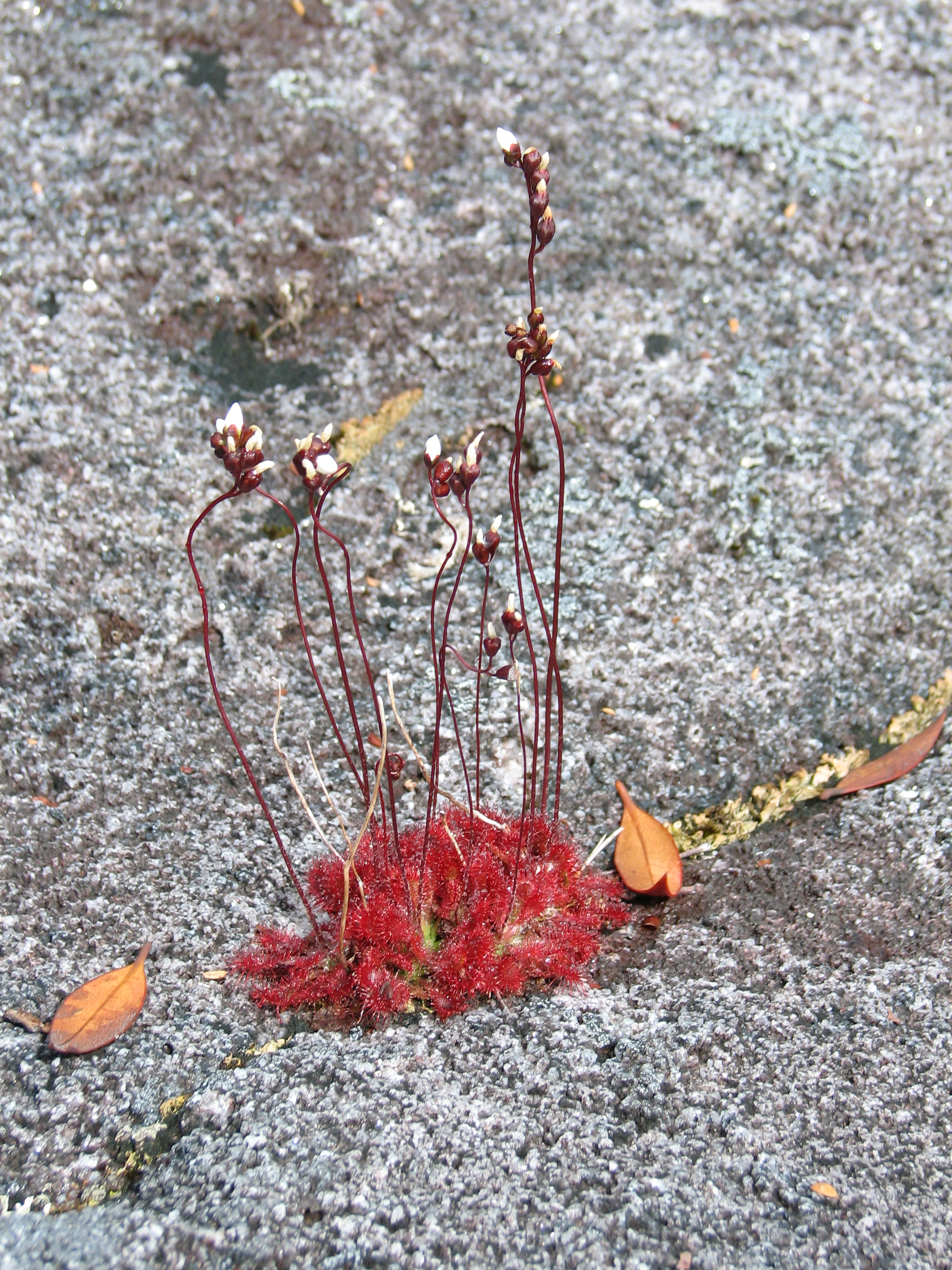
Drosera spatulata in flower

Drosera

- Drosera arcturi
- Drosera auriculata
- Drosera binata
- Drosera capensis (introduced and fully naturalised plant pest)
- Drosera peltata
- Drosera pygmaea
- Drosera spatulata
- Drosera stenopetala (endemic)

Utricularia

- Utricularia australis
- Utricularia delicatula (endemic)
- Utricularia dichotoma
- Utricularia geminiscapa
- Utricularia gibba (introduced plant pest)
- Utricularia livida (introduced and fully naturalised plant pest)

Drosera burmanni, D. filiformis, U. arenaria and U. sandersonii have been known to occasionally occur.

== Invasive species ==
Drosera capensis, U. arenaria, U. gibba, U. livida and U. sandersonii are listed on the National Pest Plant Accord since they are invasive species. The Cape sundew (D. capensis) and bladderwort (U. livida) have been found in the Auckland region and pose a threat to indigenous plants.

== See also ==
- Carnivorous plants of Australia
