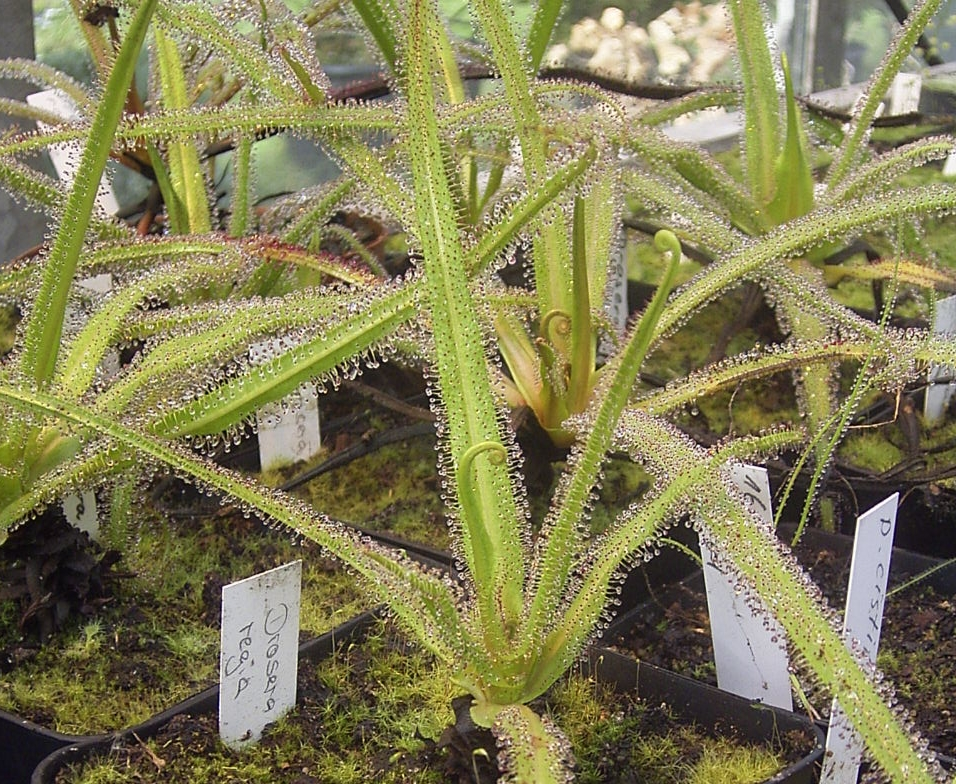
- Several plants in cultivation

Scientific classification
- Kingdom: Plantae
- Clade: Tracheophytes
- Clade: Angiosperms
- Clade: Eudicots
- Order: Caryophyllales
- Family: Droseraceae
- Genus: Drosera
- Subgenus: Drosera subg. Regiae; Seine & Barthlott
- Species: D. regia

Binomial name
- Drosera regia Stephens

Synonyms
- Freatulina regia (Stephens) Chrtek & Slavíková

= Drosera regia =

Species of South African carnivorous plant

Drosera regia, commonly known as the king sundew, is a carnivorous plant in the sundew genus Drosera that is endemic to a single valley in South Africa. Individual leaves can reach 70 cm (28 in) in length. It has many unusual relict characteristics not found in most other Drosera species, including woody rhizomes, operculate pollen, and the lack of circinate vernation in scape growth. All of these factors, combined with molecular data from phylogenetic analysis, contribute to the evidence that D. regia possesses some of the most ancient characteristics within the genus. Some of these are shared with the related Venus flytrap (Dionaea muscipula), which suggests a close evolutionary relationship.

The tentacle-covered leaves can capture large prey, such as beetles, moths, and butterflies. The tentacles of all Drosera species have special stalked glands on the leaf's upper surface that produce a sticky mucilage. The leaves are considered active flypaper traps that respond to captured prey by bending to surround it. In its native fynbos habitat, the plants compete for space with native marsh grasses and low evergreen shrubs. Of the two known populations of D. regia, the higher elevation site appears to be overgrown and is essentially extirpated. The lower elevation site is estimated to have about 50 mature plants, making it the most endangered Drosera species, since it is threatened with extinction in the wild. It is often cultivated by carnivorous plant enthusiasts, and a single cultivar has been registered.

== Description ==
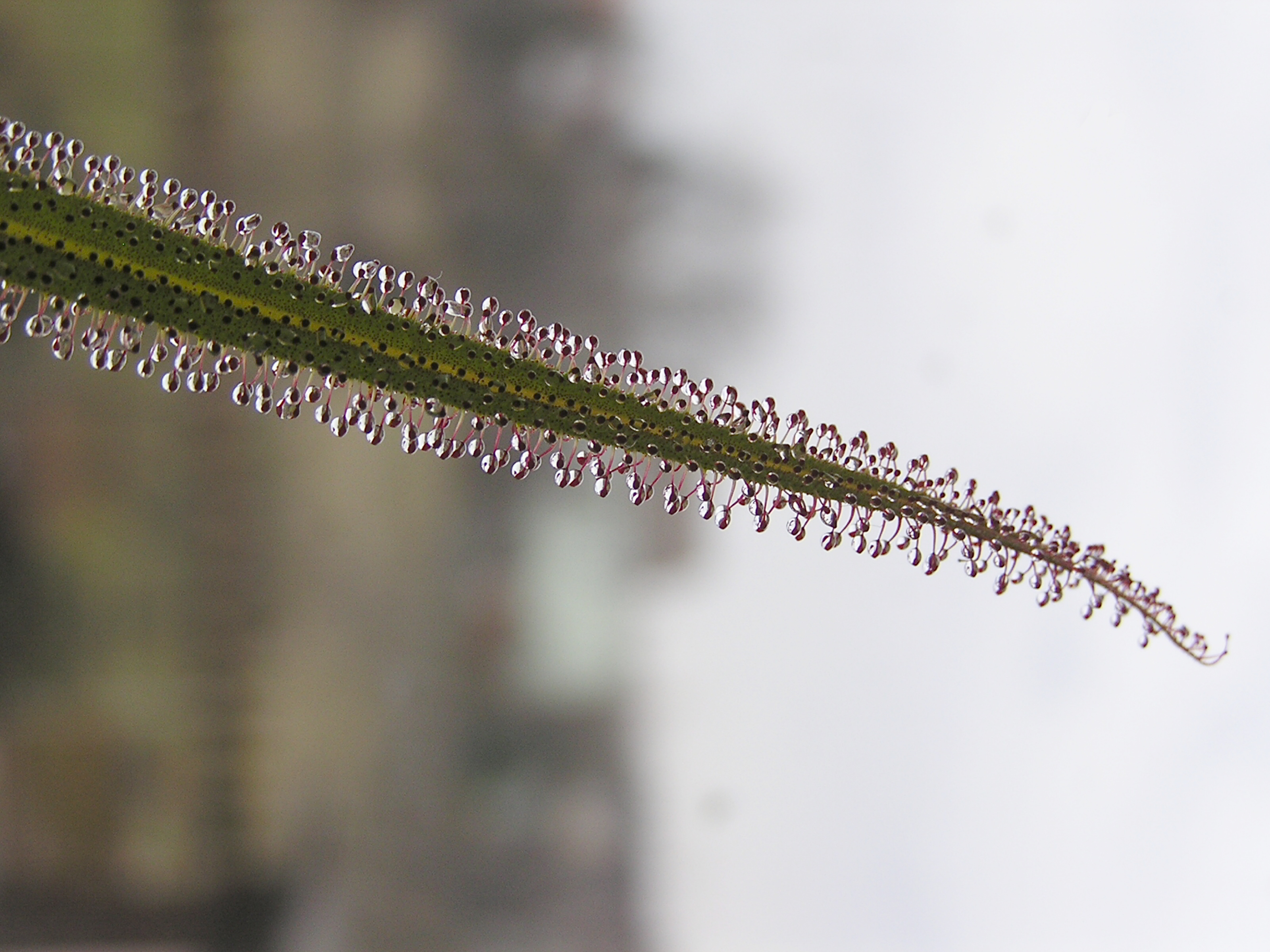
Detail of a leaf

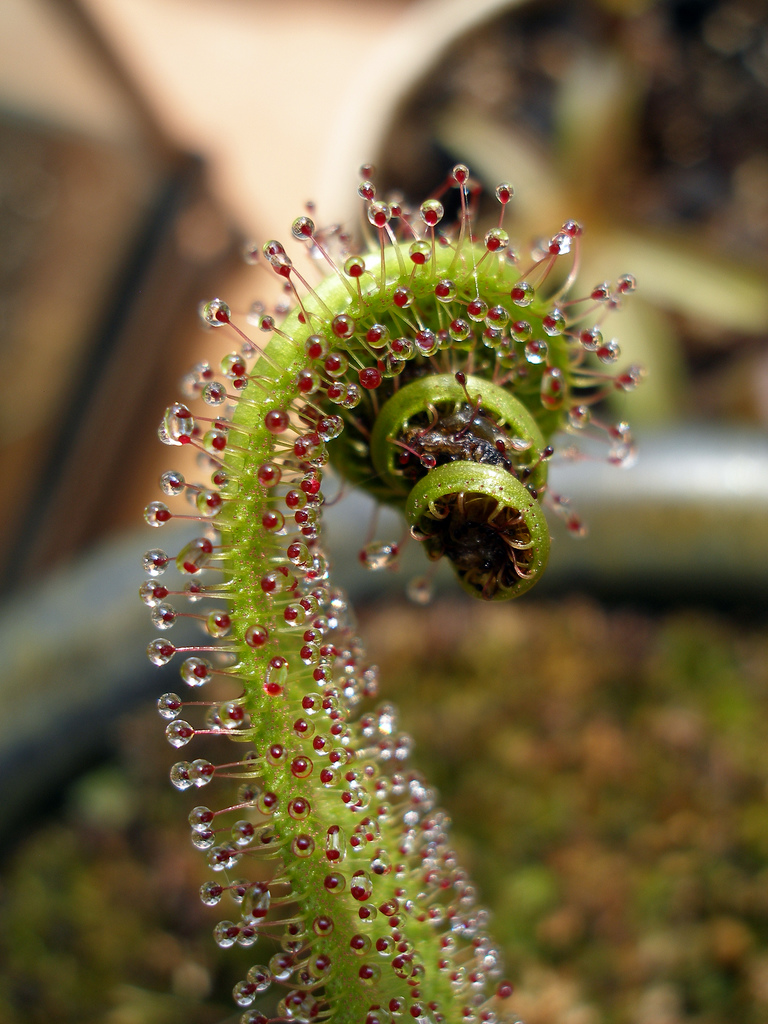
A leaf wrapped around prey

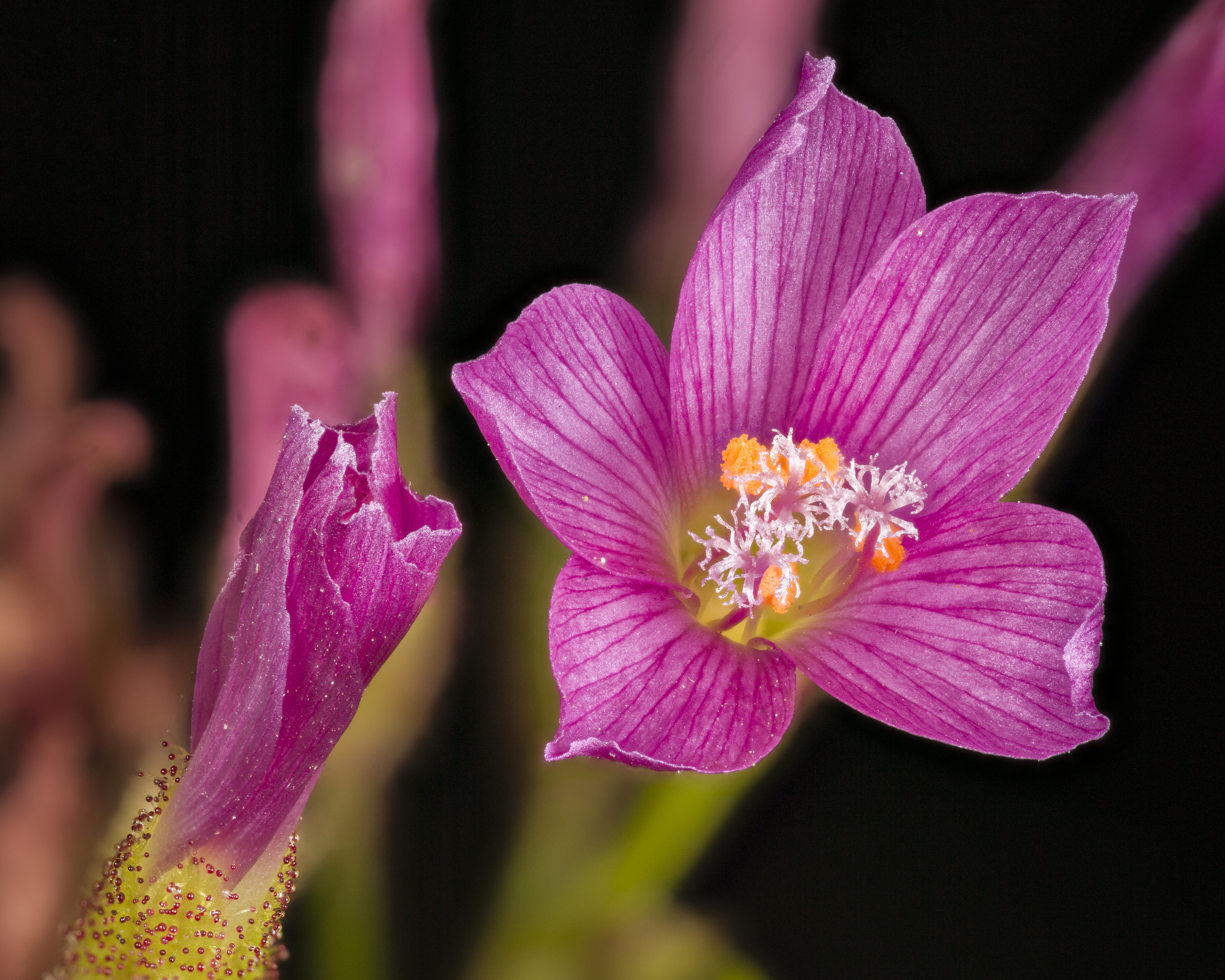
Detail of a flower

Drosera regia plants are fairly large herbs that produce horizontal woody rhizomes and a crown of large, linear leaves up to 70 cm (28 in) long and 2 cm (0.8 in) wide. The leaves possess stalked glands (tentacles) on the upper surface of the lamina along nearly the entire length of the leaf. The leaves lack petioles and stipules, emerging by circinate vernation (uncurling) and tapering to a filiform point. The tentacles and the leaf itself are capable of responding to prey by bending toward insects trapped in the sticky mucilage produced by the glands. Leaves are even capable of folding over themselves several times. Each leaf can possess thousands of tentacles, which can aid in the retention of larger prey when combined with the leaf wrapping tightly around captured insects. In its native habitat, D. regia has been known to capture large beetles, moths and butterflies. Plants go dormant during the colder season and form a dormant bud, consisting of a tight cluster of short, immature leaves. Plants begin to break dormancy in mid-July with a typical growing season lasting from October to April, though this is variable and plants can continue growing year-round without dormancy. Individual leaves die back but remain attached to the short stem, clothing the bottom portion of the plant in the blackened dead leaves of former years.

The woody rhizomes produced by the plant are one of the unusual characteristics that it shares only with D. arcturi in the genus; the absence of woody rhizomes in all other Drosera is often cited as an indication of the presumed ancient lineage of D. regia and D. arcturi. Drosera regia also produces relatively few thick, fleshy roots, which possess root hairs along the terminal 15 cm (6 in). Asexual reproduction of mature plants usually occurs after flowering with new plants arising from the rhizome and roots. After a fire, undamaged roots will often re-sprout new plants.

Drosera regia flowers in January and February, producing scapes up to 40 cm (16 in) long. The scapes emerge vertically, lacking the circinate vernation of its leaves and all other scapes of the genus Drosera, with the exception of D. arcturi. The scapes consist of two primary branches and bear 5 to 20 (sometimes 30) unscented pink flowers with 2–3 cm (0.8–1.2 in) long petals. Bracts are small, bearing some reduced tentacles. Each flower has three unbranched, spreading styles emerging from the top of the ovary and extending beyond the five erect stamens (15 mm long), which surround the ovary. This arrangement minimizes the chance of self-fertilisation. Studies have shown that the operculate pollen shed in tetrads (fused groups of four pollen grains), characteristics that are similar in the related Dionaea muscipula (the Venus flytrap) and Aldrovanda vesiculosa, is incompatible with clones, failing to produce seed when plants are self-fertilised. Seeds are brown to black, linear and ornamented with fine network-like markings, and 2 mm long and 0.5 mm in diameter. Seed is shed by the end of March.

The unusual characteristics that set it apart from other species in the genus include the woody rhizome, undivided styles, and the operculate pollen. Drosera regia shares other features with the robust Tasmanian form of D. arcturi, including the lack of stipules and petioles and the non-circinate growth of the scape.

It has a diploid chromosome number of 2n = 34, which is unusual for the genus Drosera and closer to the diploid chromosome number of the Venus flytrap (Dionaea muscipula), another member of the Droseraceae. Variable chromosome counts for Dionaea from multiple studies include 2n = 30, 32, and 33. Of the Drosera species with known chromosome counts, most are a multiple of x = 10. Based on an extensive review of karyotype studies, the botanist Fernando Rivadavia suggested that the base chromosome number for the genus could be 2n = 20, a number that many Drosera species share including the widespread D. rotundifolia. Exceptions to this base number include the Australian, New Zealand and Southeast Asian Drosera, which have chromosome numbers ranging from 2n = 6 to 64.

== Distribution and habitat ==
Drosera regia is endemic to South Africa and has only ever been found at two sites at elevations of 500 and 900 m (1,600 and 3,000 ft) in the Bainskloof Range near Wellington, Western Cape in South Africa. Despite extensive exploration, D. regia has not been found at any similar location in neighbouring valleys. Small morphological variations such as broader leaves have been recorded from these two small populations, which are restricted to an area of just a few hundred square meters. Drosera regia is found in a natural fynbos vegetation amongst dense marshy grasses. The fynbos habitat is similar to a low or medium shrubland or heathland, dominated by low evergreen shrubs.

The lower elevation site where D. regia is found is characterised by permanently damp soils consisting mostly of a gravel bench formed from a creek bed. The plants grow in a peaty quartzite sand, often with a gravel cover. Rhizomes of mature plants grow above ground and among associated grasses and sedges when gravel is absent and below ground when there is a gravel cover present. Associated vegetation included species of Leucadendron and members of the families Cyperaceae, Iridaceae, and Restionaceae. The habitat of D. regia depends on periodic fire sweeping through and keeping the larger plants from choking out D. regia. Frost occurs infrequently in the valley.

=== Conservation status ===
In a 2009 report of a 2006 trip, botanist Andreas Fleischmann noted that the higher elevation site is overgrown with plants of the family Restionaceae and he could not locate any remaining D. regia. The lower elevation site was in a similar state, but he recorded approximately 50 mature plants, making this one of the most critically endangered Drosera species. While D. regia has not been evaluated under the current International Union for the Conservation of Nature and Natural Resources (IUCN) standards for a rating on the Red List of Threatened Species, the International Carnivorous Plant Society recognised D. regia on their list of imperiled carnivorous plant species. Drosera regia was also listed as "rare" on an early IUCN report in 1997, but these earlier IUCN assessments were often poorly documented and are thus not relied upon today. Several other authors have identified how rare D. regia is in the wild, even calling it "threatened with extinction".

The short-term prognosis for natural populations of D. regia was greatly improved when a fire swept through its habitat in 2015. A team from Stellenbosch Botanical Gardens found new populations in the lower elevation zone and rediscovered plants in the higher elevation zone.

== Taxonomy and botanical history ==
Drosera regia was originally described by South African botanist Edith Layard Stephens in 1926. The binomial name Drosera regia is derived from the Greek word droseros, meaning "dew-covered" and the specific epithet regia comes from the Latin for "royal", a reference to what Stephens described as its "striking appearance". The genus is collectively referred to as the sundews, while Drosera regia is commonly referred to as the king sundew. Stephens was informed about this new species by Mr. J. Rennie, who had found several plants growing by a stream in the upper end of "Baviaans Kloof" on Easter in 1923. Additional specimens were located directly above this site on a plateau between South Ridge Peak and Observation Point. A second population was located in 1926 about 6.5 km (4 mi) away below the Slanghoek Peak near the headwaters of the Witte River.

Stephens placed D. regia in section Psychophila Planch., which at that time included D. arcturi, D. stenopetala, and D. uniflora, though she noted that the many-flowered inflorescence was unusual for this group. In 1970, the South African botanist Anna Amelia Obermeyer suggested that D. regia did not fit into any of the taxonomic groups established by Ludwig Diels in his 1906 monograph on the family. Obermeyer noted the unusual characteristics that set D. regia apart from any other Drosera species: the operculate pollen, circinate leaf vernation, undivided styles, and woody rhizomes. In 1994, Rüdiger Seine and Wilhelm Barthlott proposed classifying D. regia as the sole species in a new subgenus, Drosera subg. Regiae, to "give adequate recognition to the isolated position of D. regia within the genus." This taxonomic position was affirmed by Jan Schlauer in his dichotomous key and taxonomic revisions published in 1996. Also in 1996 two Czech researchers, Jindřich Chrtek and Zdeňka Slavíková, proposed changes to the taxonomy of the genus by splitting D. regia off into its own, monotypic genus, Freatulina. Chrtek and Slavíková cited the many morphological differences between D. regia and every other member of the genus Drosera in support of their decision to make this taxonomic split. They reaffirmed their taxonomic opinions in a 1999 article that also split the tuberous Drosera, members of the subgenus Ergaleium, to Johann Georg Christian Lehmann's resurrected genus Sondera. These taxonomic revisions, however, have not gained any support, being rejected or largely ignored by recent publications on the genus.

=== Evolutionary relationships ===
- - - - - Drosera
          - - - - - D. tomentosa
                  - D. anglica
                - D. sessilifolia
              - - - D. platypoda
                  - D. pygmaea
                - D. glanduligera
            - D. arcturi
          - D. regia
        - - Aldrovanda
          - Dionaea
  - Drosophyllum

The most parsimonious cladogram based on the combination of rbcL and 18S rDNA gene sequences from the taxa used in the analysis. Drosophyllum, which is sometimes placed in the family Droseraceae, was used as part of the outgroup.

Phylogenetic analysis of morphological characteristics and gene sequences has supported the basal position within the genus long suspected of D. regia, often regarded as the most ancient of all extant Drosera species. Its distinct morphology and unique relict characteristics, ones it likely shared with the common ancestor of all Drosera such as the operculate pollen, led early researchers to suggest its ancient position in the genus. The first cladistic analysis based on rbcL and morphological data confirmed these ideas and suggested that D. regia formed a clade sister to all other Drosera surveyed, with Dionaea muscipula forming a sister clade to all Drosera. Further analysis in 2002 based on the nuclear 18S rDNA, plastid DNA (rbcL, matK, atpB), and morphological data confirmed these relationships, supporting the basal position of D. regia in the genus and its close relationship with Dionaea and Aldrovanda. New analysis in 2003 revealed a close relationship between D. regia and D. arcturi, both of which clustered basally with respect to all other Drosera, suggesting a link between D. regia and all other Drosera through its relationship with D. arcturi.

Evidence for the evolution of "snap-traps" of Dionaea and Aldrovanda from a flypaper trap like D. regia has also emerged and been argued for based on molecular data. The molecular and physiological data implies that the Venus flytrap (Dionaea) and Aldrovanda snap-traps evolved from the flypaper traps of a common ancestor with the Drosera; the living evidence of a link between Drosera and Dionaea is D. regia and its remnant characteristics. In this evolutionary model, pre-adaptations to evolution into snap-traps were identified in several species of Drosera, such as rapid leaf and tentacle movement. The model proposes that plant carnivory by snap-trap evolved from the flypaper traps of Drosera, driven by increasing prey size. Larger prey can easily escape the sticky mucilage of flypaper traps; the evolution of snap-traps would largely prevent escape and kleptoparasitism (theft of prey captured by the plant before it can derive any benefit from it).

== Cultivation ==
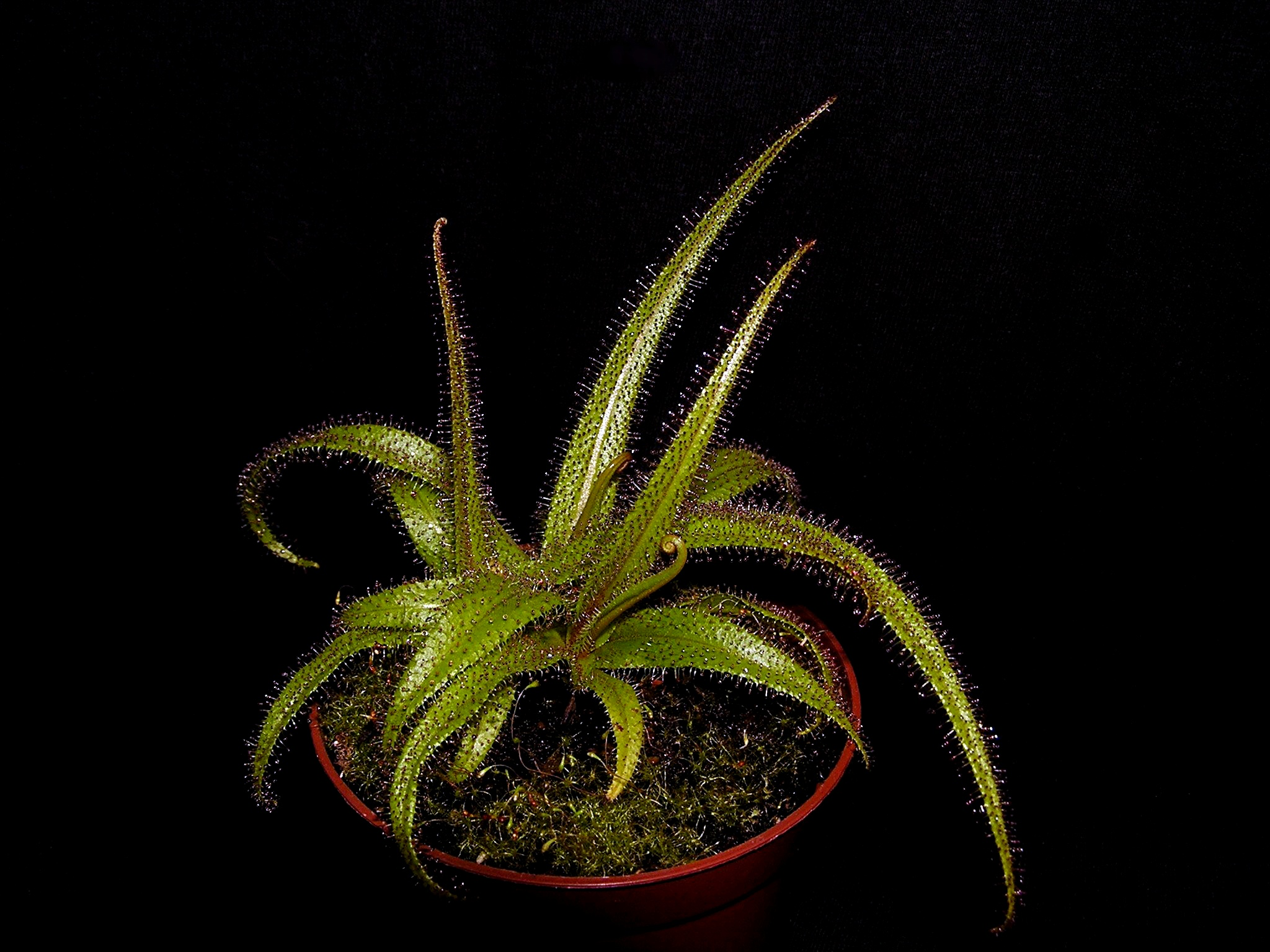
D. regia in cultivation

Drosera regia cultivation was first attempted prior to the formal description of the species in 1926. The author, Edith Layard Stephens, reported the successful cultivation of D. regia, noting that such success required "a moist and comparatively cool atmosphere", similar to that of its native environment.

Drosera regia is often described as being a difficult species to cultivate, though modern reports on its cultivation have indicated which conditions have led to success for some. For optimal growth, D. regia appears to require good soil drainage and sufficient light levels, and prefers cooler temperatures. Cool nights and warm days have been reported to induce vigorous growth. Asexual propagation is frequently achieved through small root cuttings instead of leaf cuttings, which tend to rot before roots can form. Seed germination occurs as early as 10 days to 3 or 4 weeks with fresh seed, faster than many other Drosera species. Germination is phanerocotylar (non-glandular cotyledons exposed, free from seed coverings), with the first true leaves being alternate in arrangement.

In 2004, William Joseph Clemens registered the only cultivar of this species, D. regia 'Big Easy'. It is reputed to be more robust than other clones of the species and is also more compact with maximum leaf lengths of 23 cm (9 in). Under his culture conditions, 'Big Easy' has also never flowered or gone dormant. Clemens originally obtained his D. regia from a vendor at the International Carnivorous Plant Society conference held in 2000. After sufficient investigation, he registered the new cultivar in a 2004 issue of the Carnivorous Plant Newsletter, the quarterly publication of the International Carnivorous Plant Society.
