= Utricularia troupinii =

Scientific classification
- Kingdom: Plantae
- Clade: Tracheophytes
- Clade: Angiosperms
- Clade: Eudicots
- Clade: Asterids
- Order: Lamiales
- Family: Lentibulariaceae
- Genus: Utricularia
- Subgenus: Utricularia subg. Bivalvaria
- Section: Utricularia sect. Calpidisca
- Species: U. troupinii

Binomial name
- Utricularia troupinii P.Taylor

Synonyms
- [U. welwitschii var. welwitschii P.Taylor]

Species of plant

Utricularia troupinii is a small, probably annual, carnivorous plant that belongs to the genus Utricularia. It is endemic to Burundi and Rwanda. U. troupinii grows as a terrestrial plant in wet grasslands or marshes at altitudes from 1,900 m (6,234 ft) to 2,500 m (8,202 ft). It was originally described and published by Peter Taylor in 1971, but was identified in 1964 by Taylor as a possible short spurred form of U. welwitschii.

== See also ==
- List of Utricularia species
