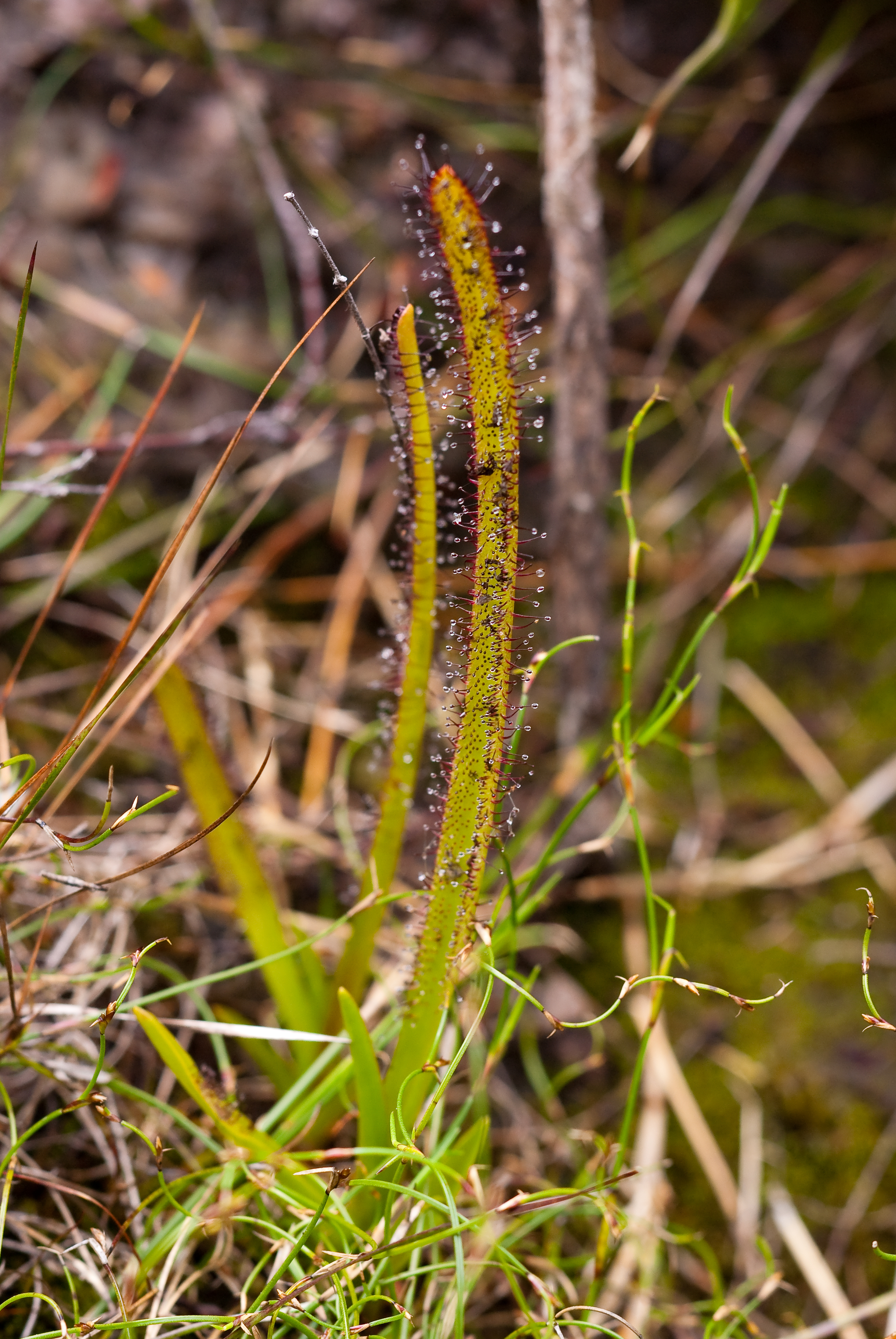

Scientific classification
- Kingdom: Plantae
- Clade: Tracheophytes
- Clade: Angiosperms
- Clade: Eudicots
- Order: Caryophyllales
- Family: Droseraceae
- Genus: Drosera
- Subgenus: Drosera subg. Arcturia
- Species: D. murfetii

Binomial name
- Drosera murfetii Lowrie & Conran

= Drosera murfetii =

Species of carnivorous plant

Drosera murfetii is a species of the carnivorous sundew family, and is endemic to western Tasmania, Australia. It has glandular hairs which produce a sticky substance that traps insects. Although similar in appearance to its close relative, D. arcturi, this species is distinct in that it tends to possess only one or two carnivorous leaves, the rest being non-carnivorous. Other features that distinguish it from D. arcturi are its larger size and tendency to produce more flowers per scape.
