= Utricularia firmula =

Scientific classification
- Kingdom: Plantae
- Clade: Tracheophytes
- Clade: Angiosperms
- Clade: Eudicots
- Clade: Asterids
- Order: Lamiales
- Family: Lentibulariaceae
- Genus: Utricularia
- Subgenus: Utricularia subg. Bivalvaria
- Section: Utricularia sect. Calpidisca
- Species: U. firmula

Binomial name
- Utricularia firmula Welw. ex Oliv.

Synonyms
- U. ecklonii var. lutea H.Perrier; U. subsessilis Schltr. ex Kamieński

Species of carnivorous plant

Utricularia firmula is a small annual carnivorous plant that belongs to the genus Utricularia. It is native to tropical and southern Africa, where it can be found in Angola, Cameroon, Côte d'Ivoire, the Democratic Republic of the Congo, Ghana, Guinea, Guinea-Bissau, Kenya, Liberia, Madagascar, Malawi, Mali, Mozambique, Nigeria, Senegal, Sierra Leone, South Africa, Sudan, Tanzania, The Gambia, Togo, Uganda, Zambia, and Zimbabwe. U. firmula grows as a terrestrial plant in damp, sandy or peaty soils in grasslands or on wet, mossy rocks, often as a weed in rice fields at altitudes from near sea level to 2,100 m (6,890 ft). It typically flowers toward the end of the wet season. It was originally named by Friedrich Welwitsch but formally described and published by Daniel Oliver in 1865.

== See also ==
- List of Utricularia species
