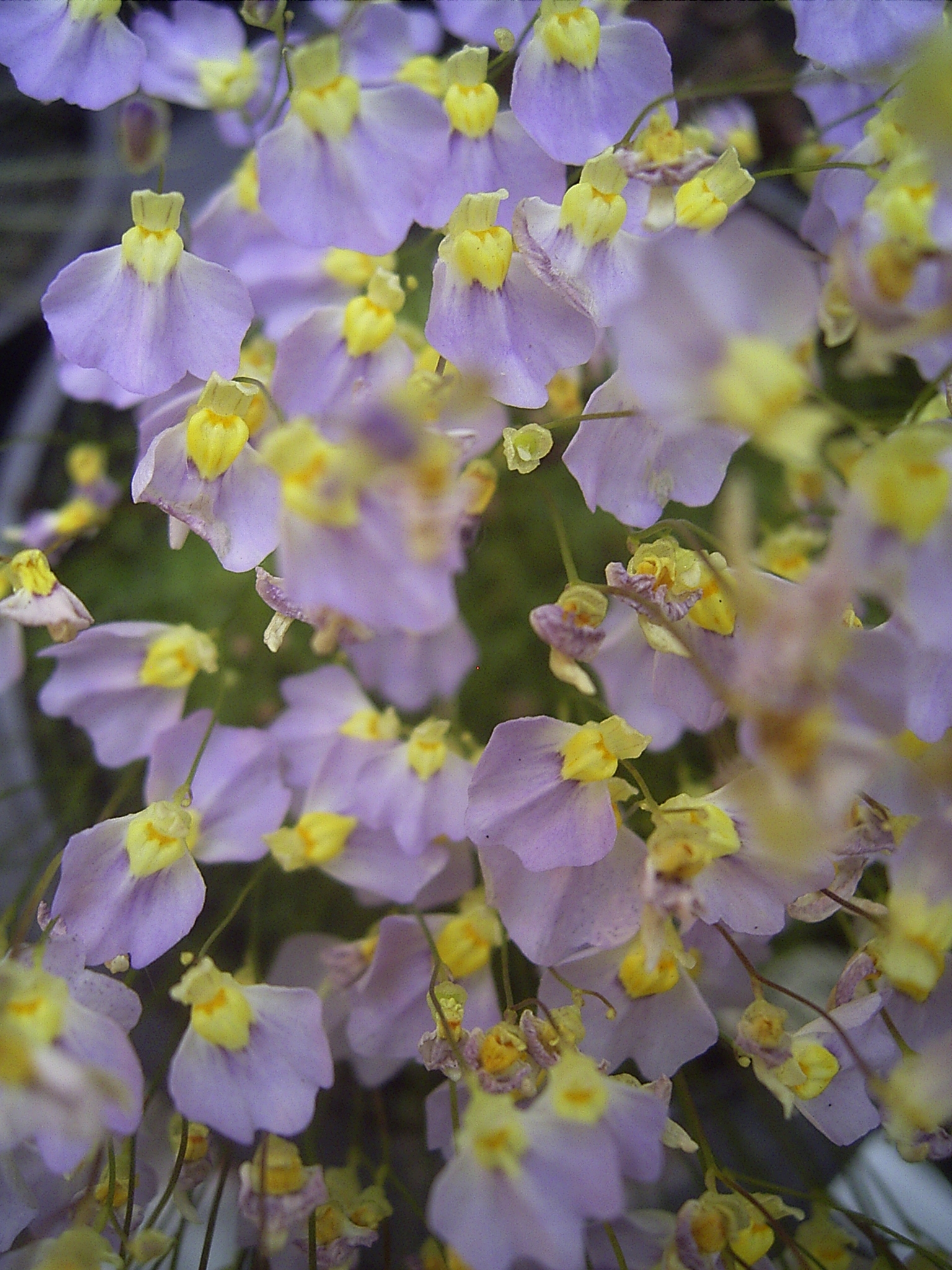
- Utricularia bisquamata

Scientific classification
- Kingdom: Plantae
- Clade: Tracheophytes
- Clade: Angiosperms
- Clade: Eudicots
- Clade: Asterids
- Order: Lamiales
- Family: Lentibulariaceae
- Genus: Utricularia
- Subgenus: Utricularia subg. Bivalvaria
- Section: Utricularia sect. Calpidisca (Barnhart) Komiya

Type species
- U. bisquamata Schrank

Species
- Utricularia arenaria; Utricularia bisquamata; Utricularia firmula; Utricularia livida; Utricularia microcalyx; Utricularia odontosepala; Utricularia pentadactyla; Utricularia sandersonii; Utricularia troupinii; Utricularia welwitschii

Synonyms
- Bucranion Raf.; Calpidisca Barnhart

= Utricularia sect. Calpidisca =

Group of carnivorous plants

Utricularia sect. Calpidisca is a section in the genus Utricularia. The ten species in this section are small terrestrial carnivorous plants native to Africa with one species extending its range into Mexico and another that extends into Asia as far as India. John Hendley Barnhart originally described and published this section in 1916 as a separate genus, Calpidisca. Sadashi Komiya revised the genus Utricularia in a 1973 taxonomic review and placed Barnhart's genus at the rank of section within Utricularia. Peter Taylor then published his taxonomic monograph of Utricularia in 1986 in which he placed Komiya's section within subgenus Utricularia. More recent phylogenetic data and revisions have reinstated subgenus Bivalvaria and have placed this section within it.

== See also ==
- List of Utricularia species
