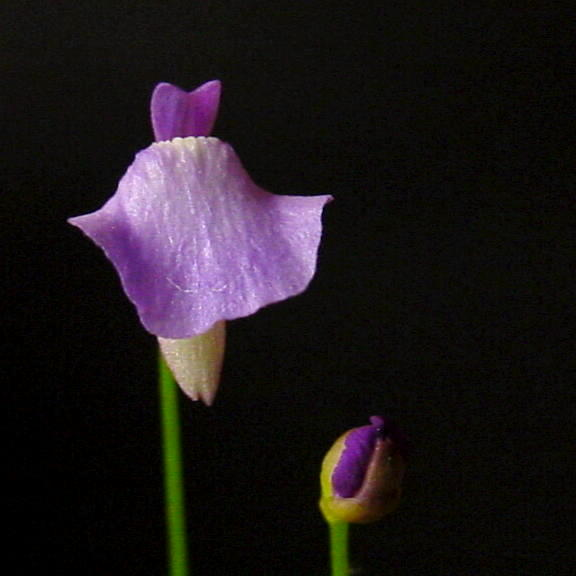
- Utricularia lateriflora

Scientific classification
- Kingdom: Plantae
- Clade: Tracheophytes
- Clade: Angiosperms
- Clade: Eudicots
- Clade: Asterids
- Order: Lamiales
- Family: Lentibulariaceae
- Genus: Utricularia
- Subgenus: Utricularia subg. Bivalvaria
- Section: Utricularia sect. Australes; P.Taylor

Type species
- U. lateriflora R.Br.

Species
- Utricularia delicatula; Utricularia lateriflora; Utricularia simplex

= Utricularia sect. Australes =

Group of carnivorous plants

Utricularia sect. Australes is a section in the genus Utricularia. The three species in this section are small terrestrial carnivorous plants native to Australia and New Zealand. Peter Taylor originally described and published this section in his 1989 taxonomic treatment of the genus, splitting off species from section Meionula. Taylor originally placed this section within subgenus Utricularia. More recent phylogenetic data and revisions have reinstated subgenus Bivalvaria and have placed this section within it.

== See also ==
- List of Utricularia species
