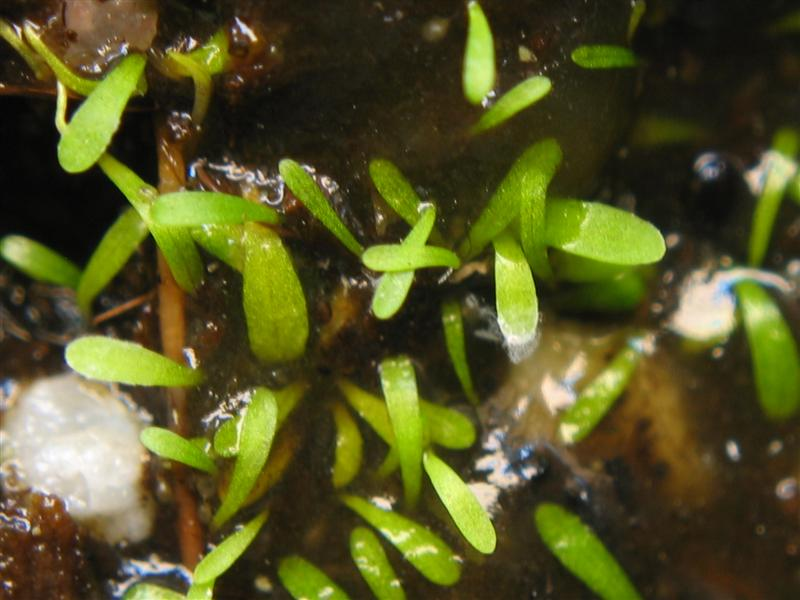

Scientific classification
- Kingdom: Plantae
- Clade: Tracheophytes
- Clade: Angiosperms
- Clade: Eudicots
- Clade: Asterids
- Order: Lamiales
- Family: Lentibulariaceae
- Genus: Utricularia
- Subgenus: Utricularia subg. Bivalvaria
- Section: Utricularia sect. Australes
- Species: U. simplex

Binomial name
- Utricularia simplex R.Br.

= Utricularia simplex =

Species of carnivorous plant

Utricularia simplex, commonly known as bluecoats, is a very small perennial carnivorous plant that belongs to the genus Utricularia. U. simplex is endemic to Western Australia. It grows as a terrestrial plant in peaty soils in heathland or swamps at altitudes near sea level. It was originally described and published by Robert Brown in 1810.

== See also ==
- List of Utricularia species
