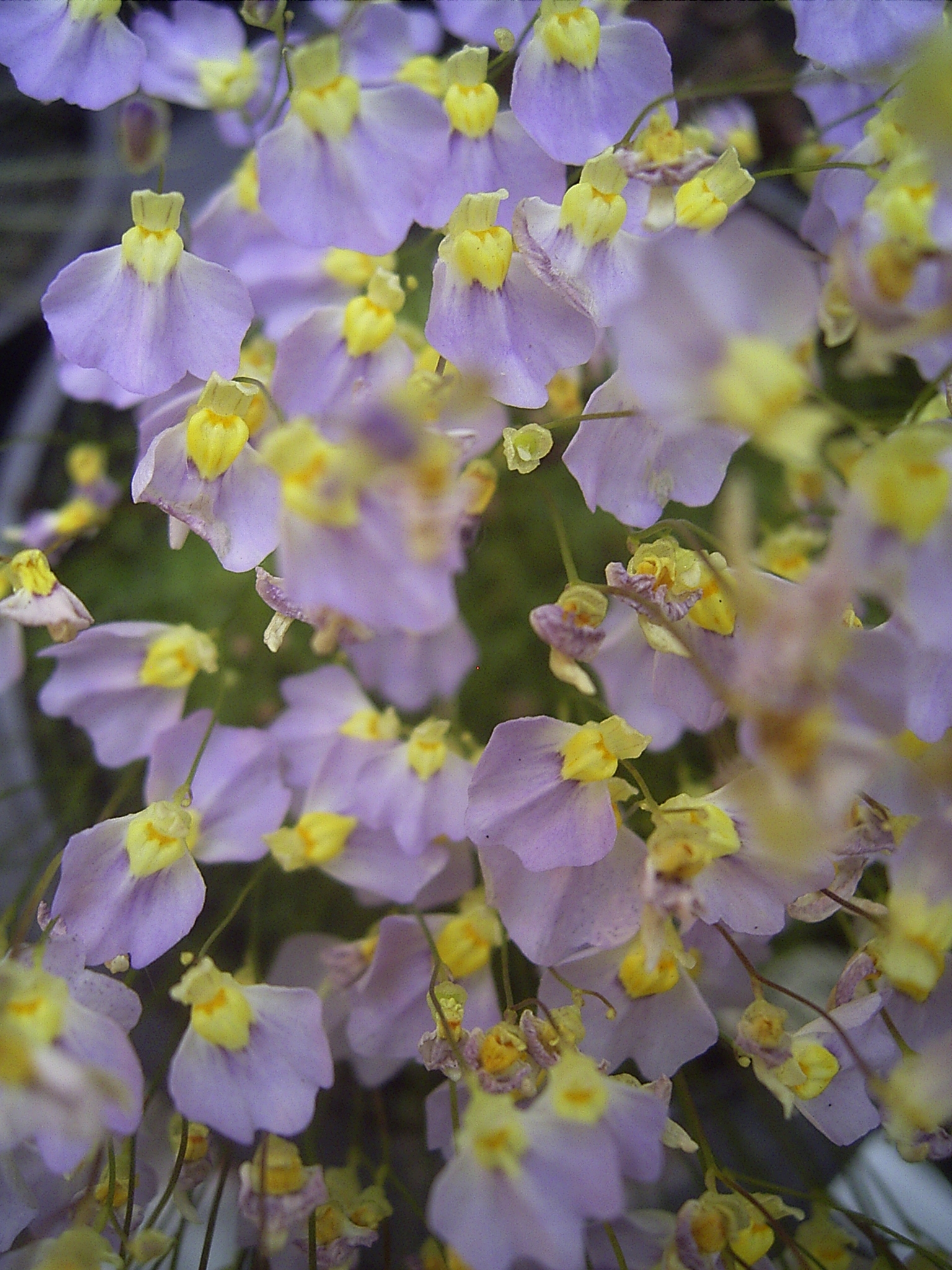

Scientific classification
- Kingdom: Plantae
- Clade: Tracheophytes
- Clade: Angiosperms
- Clade: Eudicots
- Clade: Asterids
- Order: Lamiales
- Family: Lentibulariaceae
- Genus: Utricularia
- Subgenus: Utricularia subg. Bivalvaria
- Section: Utricularia sect. Calpidisca
- Species: U. bisquamata

Binomial name
- Utricularia bisquamata Schrank

= Utricularia bisquamata =

Species of carnivorous plant

Utricularia bisquamata is a small annual carnivorous plant that belongs to the genus Utricularia. It is native to southern Africa, where it can be found in Angola, Lesotho, Madagascar, Namibia, and South Africa. U. bisquamata grows as a terrestrial plant in damp, sandy or peaty soils among mosses by streams or wet depressions at altitudes from near sea level to 1,200 m (3,937 ft) in South Africa and up to 2,250 m (7,382 ft) in Angola. It was originally described and published by Franz von Paula Schrank in 1824.

== Description ==
Utricularia bisquamata is a small annual herb growing to a height of about 12 cm (4.7 in). It has a rosette of narrow leaves and wiry stems supporting racemes of flowers with two lips, white, pale violet or occasionally yellow. The upper lip is small with two or three lobes and the lower lip has two short lobes at the side and acentral lobe. The base of the lower lip has a patch of yellow which is variable in size. The traps, translucent, are developed in the roots.

== Distribution and habitat ==
Utricularia bisquamata is native to southern Africa where it occurs in Angola, Namibia, South Africa, Eswatini, Lesotho and Madagascar, and forms part of the fynbos community. The typical habitat of this species is acidic, boggy soils in sandstone areas where it grows among mosses in wet places.

== In cultivation ==
U. bisquamata is sometimes found in cultivation and germinates freely from seed. The cultivar "Betty's Bay" has larger, more colourful flowers.
