= Utricularia odontosepala =

Scientific classification
- Kingdom: Plantae
- Clade: Tracheophytes
- Clade: Angiosperms
- Clade: Eudicots
- Clade: Asterids
- Order: Lamiales
- Family: Lentibulariaceae
- Genus: Utricularia
- Subgenus: Utricularia subg. Bivalvaria
- Section: Utricularia sect. Calpidisca
- Species: U. odontosepala

Binomial name
- Utricularia odontosepala Stapf

Synonyms
- U. welwitschii var. odontosepala (Stapf) P.Taylor

Species of carnivorous plant

Utricularia odontosepala is a small to medium-sized, probably annual, carnivorous plant that belongs to the genus Utricularia. It is native to tropical Africa, where it can be found in the Democratic Republic of the Congo, Malawi, and Zambia. U. odontosepala grows as a terrestrial plant in damp, peaty soils in grasslands at altitudes from 1,300 m (4,265 ft) to 2,200 m (7,218 ft). It typically flowers between April and September. It was originally described and published by Otto Stapf in 1912. Peter Taylor later reduced the species to a variety of U. welwitschii in 1964 but then reversed his decision and reestablished Stapf's original treatment of the species.

== See also ==
- List of Utricularia species
