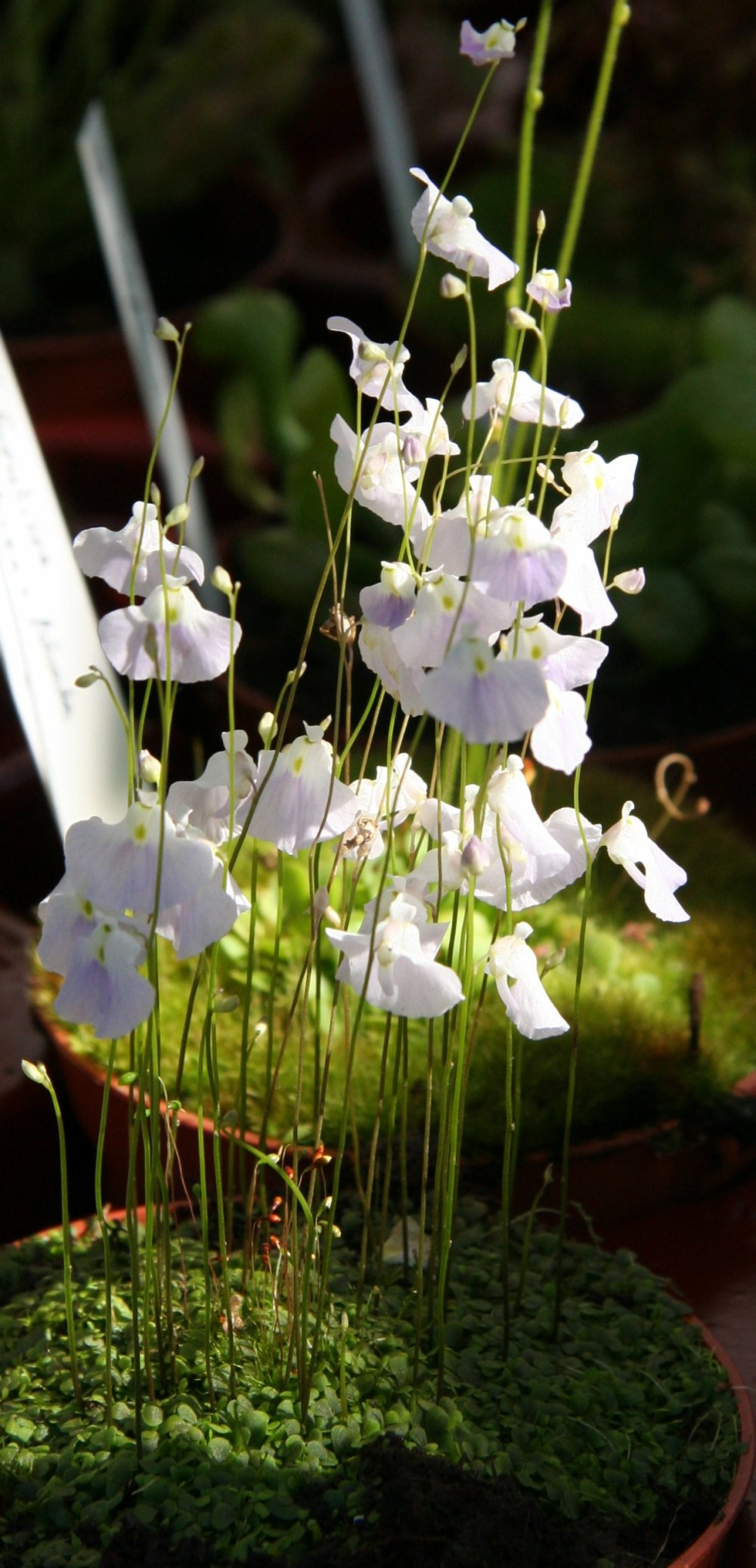
- Flowers

Conservation status
- Least Concern (IUCN 3.1)

Scientific classification
- Kingdom: Plantae
- Clade: Embryophytes
- Clade: Tracheophytes
- Clade: Spermatophytes
- Clade: Angiosperms
- Clade: Eudicots
- Clade: Asterids
- Order: Lamiales
- Family: Lentibulariaceae
- Genus: Utricularia
- Subgenus: Utricularia subg. Bivalvaria
- Section: Utricularia sect. Calpidisca
- Species: U. livida

Binomial name
- Utricularia livida E.Mey.

= Utricularia livida =

Species of plant

Utricularia livida is a species of flowering plant in the bladderwort family, Lentibulariaceae. It is sometimes referred to by the common name leaden bladderwort. It is native to central and southern Africa, and Mexico. Growing to 50 cm (20 in) tall and broad, it is a carnivorous perennial. It was originally described and published by Ernst Heinrich Friedrich Meyer in 1837.

== Name ==
The Latin specific epithet livida means "pale" or "lead-coloured", referring to the colour of the flowers.

== Description ==
As with other members of its family, the leaf assembly is below ground, where carnivory occurs. Tiny bladders consume micro-organisms which multiply in wet soil. Above ground it consists of kidney-shaped, pale lavender or white flowers on straight slender stems. Flowering occurs mainly during the summer, but may be triggered at any time after a dry period.

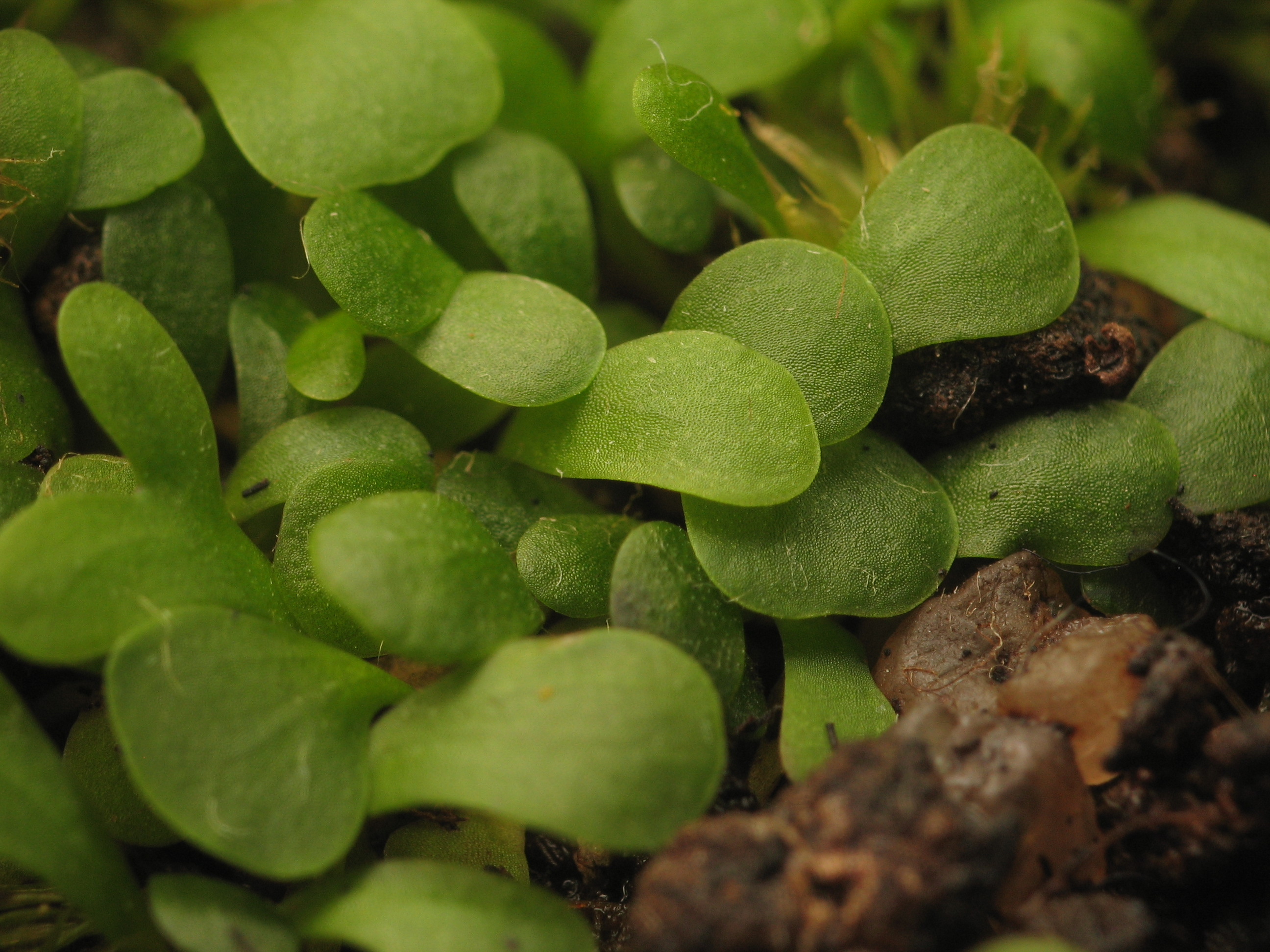
Leaves

== Habitat and distribution ==
Utricularia livida can be found in Angola, the Democratic Republic of the Congo, Ethiopia, Kenya, Lesotho, Madagascar, Malawi, Mozambique, Rwanda, Somalia, South Africa, Sudan, Eswatini, Tanzania, Uganda, Zambia, and Zimbabwe. It also has a widespread native range in Mexico. It grows as a terrestrial plant in boggy areas or shallow soils over rock at altitudes from near sea level to 2,830 m (9,285 ft).

== Cultivation ==
Like its relative, U. sandersonii, this plant is valued for its ornamental flowers and is grown as a houseplant. It does not tolerate freezing, so in temperate areas it must be cultivated under glass, in pans of damp sand in full sun. It has gained the Royal Horticultural Society's Award of Garden Merit.

== Synonyms ==
U. livida covers a large native range and is an extremely variable species, which accounts for the high degree of synonymy.

- Calpidisca denticulata (Benj.) Barnhart
- Utricularia afromontana R.E.Fr.
- U. andicola Benj.
- U. denticulata Benj.
- U. dregei Kamieński
- U. dregei var. stricta Kamieński
- U. eburnea R.E.Fr.
- U. elevata Kamieński
- U. elevata var. macowani Kamieński
- U. engleri Kamieński
- U. exilis P.Taylor
- U. gentryi Standl.
- U. humbertiana H.Perrier
- U. humbertiana var. andringitrensis H.Perrier
- U. humilis Phillips
- U. ibarensis Baker
- [U. kirkii Stapf]
- U. livida var. engleri (Kamieński) Stapf
- U. livida var. micrantha Kamieński
- U. livida var. pauciflora Kamieński
- U. lobata Fernald
- U. longecalcarata Benj.
- U. madagascariensis A.DC.
- U. mauroyae H.Perrier
- U. odontosperma Stapf
- [U. parkeri H.Perrier]
- [U. prehensilis var. huillensis Kamieński]
- U. sanguinea Oliv.
- U. sanguinea var. minor Kamieński
- U. sematophora Stapf
- U. sinuata Benj.
- U. spartea Baker
- U. spartea var. marojejensis H.Perrier
- U. spartea var. subspicata H.Perrier
- U. spartioides Elliot ex H.Perrier
- U. sprengelii var. humilis Kamieński
- U. transrugosa Stapf
- [U. tribracteata Kamieński]

== See also ==
- List of Utricularia species
