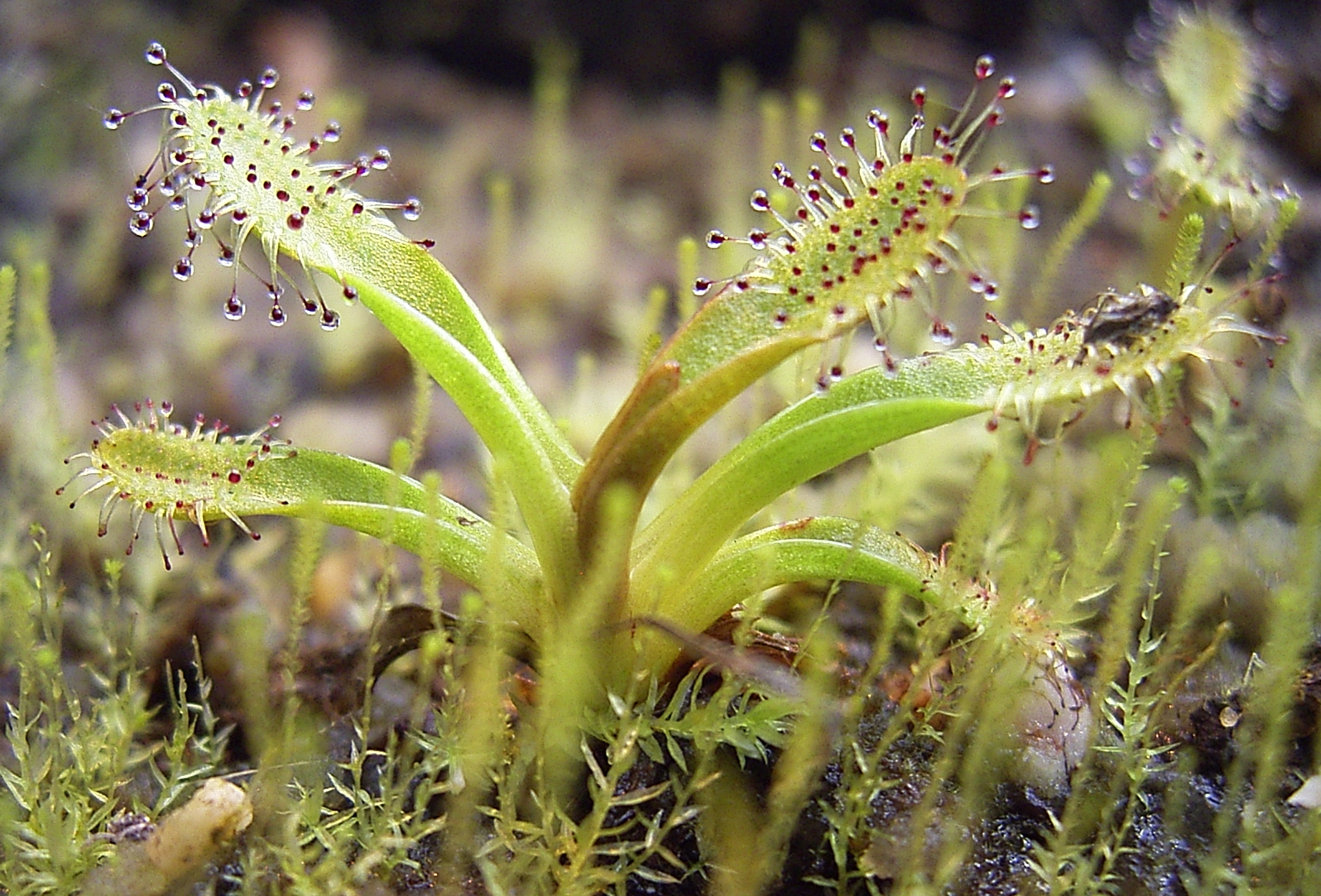
- Drosera arcturi

Scientific classification
- Kingdom: Plantae
- Clade: Embryophytes
- Clade: Tracheophytes
- Clade: Spermatophytes
- Clade: Angiosperms
- Clade: Eudicots
- Order: Caryophyllales
- Family: Droseraceae
- Genus: Drosera
- Subgenus: Drosera subg. Arcturia; Planch.

Type species
- Drosera arcturi

Species
- See text

= Drosera subg. Arcturia =

Subgenus of carnivorous plants

Drosera subg. Arcturia is a subgenus of three species of sundews (carnivorous plants) in the genus Drosera, native to Australia and New Zealand.

== Description and distribution ==
Image	Scientific name	Distribution
	Drosera arcturi Hook.	Australia and New Zealand
	Drosera murfetii Lowrie & Conran	Tasmania
	Drosera stenopetala Hook.f.	New Zealand.

== See also ==
- List of Drosera species
