= Utricularia microcalyx =

Scientific classification
- Kingdom: Plantae
- Clade: Tracheophytes
- Clade: Angiosperms
- Clade: Eudicots
- Clade: Asterids
- Order: Lamiales
- Family: Lentibulariaceae
- Genus: Utricularia
- Subgenus: Utricularia subg. Bivalvaria
- Section: Utricularia sect. Calpidisca
- Species: U. microcalyx

Binomial name
- Utricularia microcalyx (P.Taylor) P.Taylor

Synonyms
- U. welwitschii var. microcalyx P.Taylor

Species of carnivorous plant

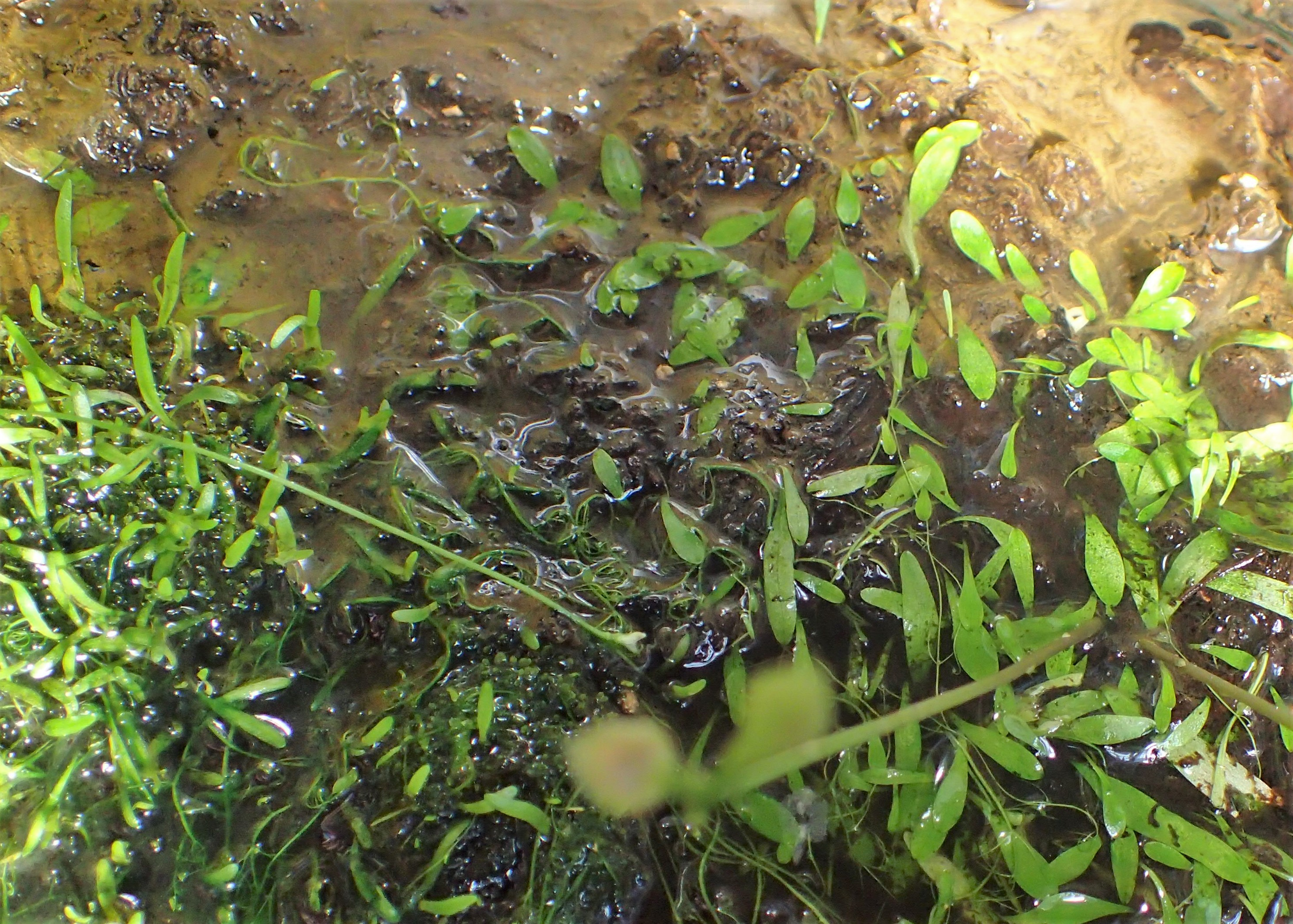
Utricularia microcalyx

Utricularia microcalyx is a small to medium-sized annual carnivorous plant that belongs to the genus Utricularia. It is native to tropical Africa, where it can be found in the Democratic Republic of the Congo and Zambia. U. microcalyx grows as a terrestrial plant in damp, sandy or peaty soils in grasslands at altitudes from 1,200 m (3,937 ft) to 1,650 m (5,413 ft). It typically flowers between February and July. It was originally described and published by Peter Taylor in 1964 as a variety of U. welwitschii. Taylor elevated this variety to the species level in 1971.

== See also ==
- List of Utricularia species
