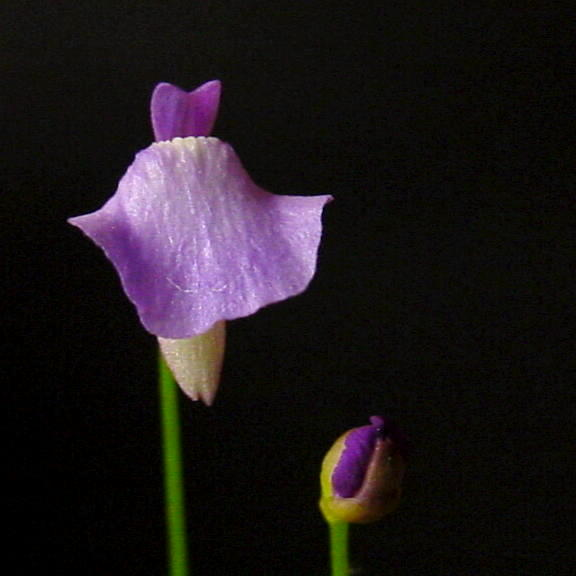

Scientific classification
- Kingdom: Plantae
- Clade: Tracheophytes
- Clade: Angiosperms
- Clade: Eudicots
- Clade: Asterids
- Order: Lamiales
- Family: Lentibulariaceae
- Genus: Utricularia
- Subgenus: Utricularia subg. Bivalvaria
- Section: Utricularia sect. Australes
- Species: U. lateriflora

Binomial name
- Utricularia lateriflora R.Br.

Synonyms
- U. parviflora R.Br.

= Utricularia lateriflora =

Species of plant

Utricularia lateriflora, the small bladderwort, is a small to medium-sized perennial carnivorous plant that belongs to the genus Utricularia. U. lateriflora is endemic to Australia and can be found in New South Wales, Queensland, South Australia, Tasmania, and Victoria. It grows as a terrestrial plant in sandy or peaty soils in heathland at lower altitudes. It was originally described and published by Robert Brown in 1810.

== See also ==
- List of Utricularia species
