= Utricularia pentadactyla =

Scientific classification
- Kingdom: Plantae
- Clade: Tracheophytes
- Clade: Angiosperms
- Clade: Eudicots
- Clade: Asterids
- Order: Lamiales
- Family: Lentibulariaceae
- Genus: Utricularia
- Subgenus: Utricularia subg. Bivalvaria
- Section: Utricularia sect. Calpidisca
- Species: U. pentadactyla

Binomial name
- Utricularia pentadactyla P.Taylor

Species of carnivorous plant

Utricularia pentadactyla is a small annual carnivorous plant that belongs to the genus Utricularia. It is native to tropical Africa, where it can be found in Angola, Burundi, the Democratic Republic of the Congo, Ethiopia, Kenya, Malawi, Sudan, Tanzania, Uganda, Zambia, and Zimbabwe. U. pentadactyla grows as a terrestrial plant in damp, sandy or peaty soils in grasslands or shallow soils over rock at altitudes from 1,500 m (4,921 ft) to 2,100 m (6,890 ft). It was originally described and published by Peter Taylor in 1954, the first Utricularia species described by Taylor.

== See also ==
- List of Utricularia species
