= Utricularia welwitschii =

Scientific classification
- Kingdom: Plantae
- Clade: Tracheophytes
- Clade: Angiosperms
- Clade: Eudicots
- Clade: Asterids
- Order: Lamiales
- Family: Lentibulariaceae
- Genus: Utricularia
- Subgenus: Utricularia subg. Bivalvaria
- Section: Utricularia sect. Calpidisca
- Species: U. welwitschii

Binomial name
- Utricularia welwitschii Oliv.

Synonyms
- U. aberrans Bosser; U. linarioides Welw. ex Oliv.; U. welwitschii var. pusilla Suess.; U. welwitschii var. welwitschii P.Taylor

Species of carnivorous plant

Utricularia welwitschii is a small to medium-sized, probably perennial, carnivorous plant that belongs to the genus Utricularia. It is endemic to tropical Africa, where it can be found in the Democratic Republic of the Congo, Madagascar, Malawi, South Africa, Tanzania, Zambia, and Zimbabwe. U. welwitschii grows as a terrestrial plant in sandy or peaty soils in marshy grasslands at altitudes from 1,000 m (3,281 ft) to 2,200 m (7,218 ft). It was originally described and published by Daniel Oliver in 1865. Taylor previously described two varieties of U. welwitschii, U. welwitschii var. odontosepala and U. welwitschii var. microcalyx, in 1964, but later elevated them to the rank of species as U. odontosepala and U. microcalyx, respectively. It is named in honor of Friedrich Welwitsch.

== See also ==
- List of Utricularia species
