= Utricularia delicatula =

Scientific classification
- Kingdom: Plantae
- Clade: Tracheophytes
- Clade: Angiosperms
- Clade: Eudicots
- Clade: Asterids
- Order: Lamiales
- Family: Lentibulariaceae
- Genus: Utricularia
- Subgenus: Utricularia subg. Bivalvaria
- Section: Utricularia sect. Australes
- Species: U. delicatula

Binomial name
- Utricularia delicatula Cheeseman

Synonyms
- Utricularia lateriflora auct. non R.Br.: Allen (1961)

Species of carnivorous plant

Utricularia delicatula is a terrestrial species of bladderwort and is unique within its genus in being endemic to New Zealand. The specific epithet is Latin for "dainty" and refers to the small flowers of this species. This species has a small geographic range, being found in the northern half of the North Island at low elevations (below 200 m) in the Waikato and in Northland, but also further afield on Chatham Island in the east.
