= Edith Layard Stephens =

South African botanist (1884–1966)

- Born: 6 December 1884; Cape Town, Cape Colony
- Died: 2 March 1966 (aged 81); Cape Town, South Africa
- Scientific career
- Fields: Botany
- Institutions: University of Cape Town

Edith Layard Stephens (1884-1966) was a South African botanist, a leading authority on algae and fungi, particularly edible and poisonous mushrooms.

== Early life and education ==
Stephens was born on December 6, 1884, in Cape Town, Cape Colony, as the daughter of Michael Stephens, who was a chief locomotive superintendent of the Cape Government Railways and Annie Hoskyn. In 1901, she matriculated at the Rustenburg School for Girls in Rondebosch, Cape Town. She studied at the South African College (which later became the University of Cape Town) and later that year received the Bachelor of Arts degree at the University of Cape of Good Hope. In 1906, Stephans completed the BA degree with honours in botany being awarded by the Cape of Good Hope and was awarded with the gold medal for science and the Queen Victoria Scholarship and the 1881 Exhibition Scholarship in 1907, which led her to Cambridge University.

== Career and accomplishments ==
In 1908, Stephens published A preliminary note on the embryo-sac and embryo of certain Penaeaceae in the Annals of Botany, which was based on her research that she started since the South African College. Though her studies did not lead to a qualification since the Cambridge University did not award degrees to women during those years, she was elected as a fellow of the Linnean Society of London. Around 1911, Stephhens returned to South Africa. During the first half year of 1913, she was a temporary lecturer in botany at the South African College and later succeeded W.T. Saxton, as a lecturer in botany and remained in the Department of Botany when the college became the University of Cape Town in 1918, until she retired in 1940. She then became honorary reader in plant taxonomy at Bolus Herbarium in 1952. She made a special study in freshwater algae and fungi, known for her two illustrated booklets on poisonous and edible fungi and also contributed the Pennaeaceae. She continued as honorary reader in systematic botany (cryptogams) in Bolus Herbarium until her death in 1966.

== Awards ==
The Cape Tercentenary Foundation awarded Stephens for her contribution towards preservation of natural fauna and flora in the Cape in 1957. She used this grant to buy an area called Isoetes Vlei, which she then presented to the National Botanic Gardens, known as the Edith Stephens Cape Flats Flora Reserve.

== Works ==
- Notes on the Aquatic Flora of South Africa, Cape Town : University of Cape Town, 1924.
- The Botanical Features of the South Western Cape Province Cape Town : Specialty Press of S.A. Ltd., 1929. (With Robert Harold Compton; Robert Stephen Adamson; Paul Andries van der Byl and Margaret R Levyns, Mrs.)
- Some South African Edible Fungi, Longmans, Green and Co., Cape Town, 1953
- Some South African Poisonous and Inedible Fungi, Longmans, Green and Co., Cape Town, 1953
