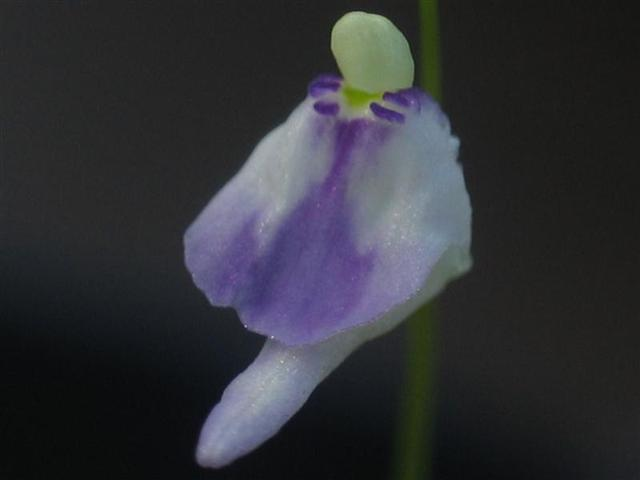

Scientific classification
- Kingdom: Plantae
- Clade: Tracheophytes
- Clade: Angiosperms
- Clade: Eudicots
- Clade: Asterids
- Order: Lamiales
- Family: Lentibulariaceae
- Genus: Utricularia
- Subgenus: Utricularia subg. Bivalvaria
- Section: Utricularia sect. Calpidisca
- Species: U. arenaria

Binomial name
- Utricularia arenaria A.DC.

= Utricularia arenaria =

Species of carnivorous plant

Utricularia arenaria is a small annual carnivorous plant that belongs to the genus Utricularia. It is native to tropical and southern Africa, where it can be found in Angola, Burundi, Cameroon, Côte d'Ivoire, the Democratic Republic of the Congo, Ethiopia, Gabon, Ghana, Kenya, Madagascar, Malawi, Mali, Mozambique, Nigeria, Senegal, Sierra Leone, South Africa, Sudan, Tanzania, Togo, Uganda, Zambia, and Zimbabwe. There has also been a single collection from central India in Madhya Pradesh. U. arenaria grows as a terrestrial plant in damp, sandy or peaty soils in swampy grasslands or marshes at altitudes from near sea level to 2,400 m (7,874 ft). It was originally described and published by Alphonse Pyrame de Candolle in 1844.

== Synonyms ==
U. arenaria covers a vast native range and is a variable species, which accounts for the moderate amount of synonymy.

- [U. ecklonii H.Perrier]
- U. exilis Oliv.
- U. exilis var. arenaria (A.DC.) Kamieński
- U. exilis var. bryoides Welw. ex Hiern
- U. exilis var. ecklonii (Spreng.) Kamieński
- U. exilis var. hirsuta Kamieński
- U. exilis var. nematoscapa Welw. ex Hiern
- U. kirkii Stapf
- U. monophylla Dinter
- [U. parkeri H.Perrier]
- Utricularia sp. prob. U. exilis Oliv. & sp. aff. U. exilis Suess. & Merxm.
- U. tribracteata Hochst. ex A.Rich.

== See also ==
- List of Utricularia species
