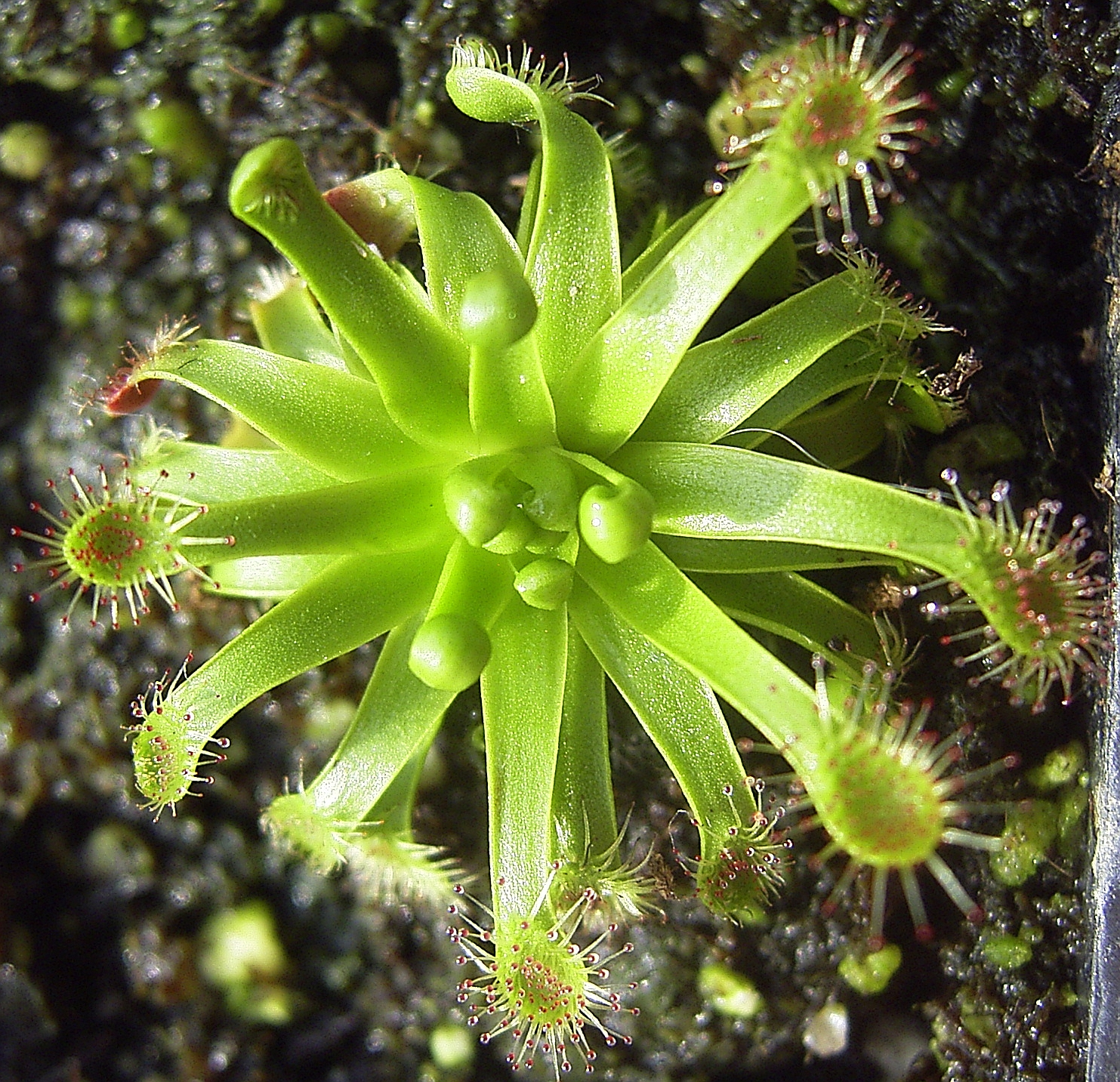

Scientific classification
- Kingdom: Plantae
- Clade: Tracheophytes
- Clade: Angiosperms
- Clade: Eudicots
- Order: Caryophyllales
- Family: Droseraceae
- Genus: Drosera
- Subgenus: Drosera subg. Arcturia
- Species: D. stenopetala

Binomial name
- Drosera stenopetala Hook.f. (1853)

= Drosera stenopetala =

Species of carnivorous plant

Drosera stenopetala is an insectivorous, rosette-forming perennial sub-alpine or alpine herb. It is endemic to New Zealand.

== Description ==
D. stenopetala is winter-dormant, growing from an underground rhizome, and its leaf shape changes over the growing season; emerging as a flattened rosette of 10 or so short leaves with broad leaf stalks, which then become more raised. Closer to its flowering season the plant produces much more erect leaves with narrow, hairless leaf stalks up to 80 mm (3.1 in) long, with rounded spoon-shaped leaves 15 mm (0.59 in) long, covered in long glandular hairs. As its growing season comes to an end, leaves become shorter again.

Flowering occurs between December and February, the solitary hairless flower stalk up to 20 cm (7.9 in) tall bears a single flower. The calyx is five-lobed, and smooth, 3.5 mm (0.14 in) in length. Petals are up to 10 mm (0.39 in) long, narrow at the base, becoming narrowly wedge-shaped or rounded in form. Petals are white with a yellow-green tinge at their base. The ovary is located above the petal bases and is large with three styles that are themselves divided. The seed capsule contains small, brown-black seeds, which are possibly wind dispersed.

Characteristic features include involute (inwardly curved) petioles and upright leaves.

== Distribution ==
The range of D. stenopetala extends from the Ruahine and Tararua Ranges in the north down the Southern Alps to Stewart Island. It is also found on the Auckland Islands and Campbell Island. It is a wetland obligate, and is patchily distributed in cold environments such as montane to alpine bogs, seepages or wet rock faces, but can occur to sea-level in the colder, southerly parts of its range.

== Etymology and taxonomy ==
The specific epithet means "with narrow petals", which is somewhat misleading given that the petals of this plant are fairly wide. A species of sundew, it is unique within its genus in being endemic to New Zealand. It is one of New Zealand's two alpine species of Drosera, the other being Drosera arcturi.

== See also ==
- Carnivorous plants of New Zealand

== Sources cited ==
- Hooker, J.D. (1844), The botany of the Antarctic voyage of H.M. discovery ships Erebus and Terror in the Years 1839-1843 under the command of Captain Sir James Clark Ross, Illustrator: Walter Hood Fitch, doi:10.5962/BHL.TITLE.16029, OCLC 38878765, Wikidata Q6435950
- Allan, H.H. (1961), Flora of New Zealand Volume I, Manaaki Whenua – Landcare Research, Wikidata Q134194216
- Gibson, R. (September 1994). "Carnivorous Plants of New Zealand: A Review" (PDF). Carnivorous Plant Newsletter. 23.
