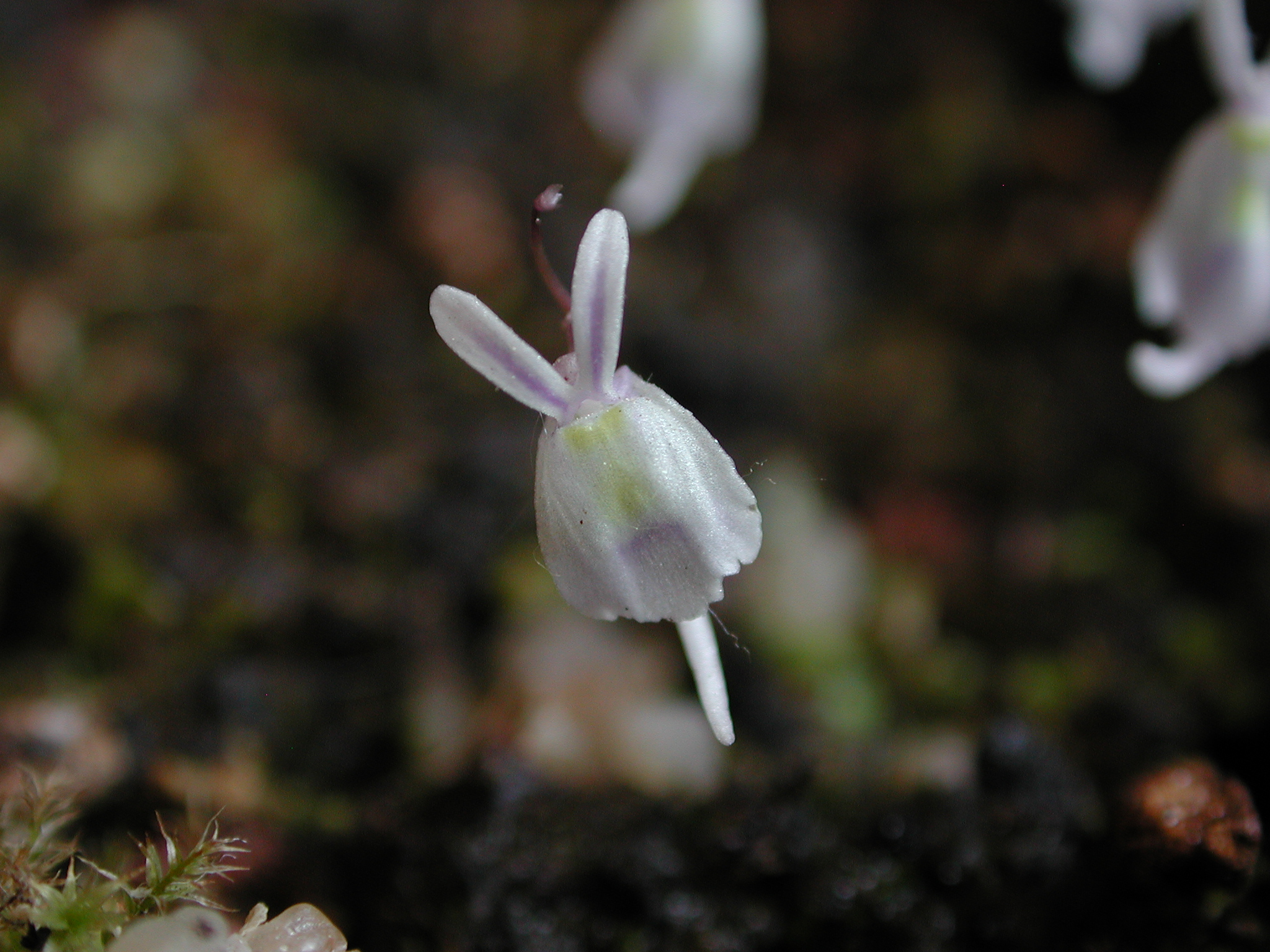

Scientific classification
- Kingdom: Plantae
- Clade: Tracheophytes
- Clade: Angiosperms
- Clade: Eudicots
- Clade: Asterids
- Order: Lamiales
- Family: Lentibulariaceae
- Genus: Utricularia
- Subgenus: Utricularia subg. Bivalvaria
- Section: Utricularia sect. Calpidisca
- Species: U. sandersonii

Binomial name
- Utricularia sandersonii Oliv.

Synonyms
- U. sandersonii var. treubii (Kamieński) Kamieński; U. treubii Kamieński

= Utricularia sandersonii =

Species of carnivorous plant

Utricularia sandersonii, Sanderson's bladderwort, is a species of flowering plant in the bladderwort family. Originally described and published by the British botanist Daniel Oliver in 1865, it is a carnivorous evergreen perennial, endemic to northern KwaZulu-Natal and Transkei in South Africa.

== Description ==
Up to 50 cm (20 in) tall and broad, it grows as a lithophyte on wet, often vertical rocky surfaces at altitudes from 210 m (689 ft) to 1,200 m (3,937 ft). Carnivory occurs beneath the surface, whereby tiny bladders on underground stems capture the micro-organisms which inhabit saturated soil. The visible parts of the plant are not carnivorous. Above ground it bears quantities of white flowers with pale blue markings, long forward-curved spurs and double lobes which resemble rabbits' ears.

A flowering cluster of Utricularia sandersonii.

== Cultivation ==
Utricularia sandersonii thrives in conditions that are relatively easy to replicate at home, and so has become a popular houseplant which can tolerate temperatures down to 1 °C (34 °F), but not freezing. It must be kept moist at all times and requires moderate lighting for continuous flowering. It is not able to perform self-pollination, so a male and a female specimen is needed for sexual reproduction, but asexual reproduction by fragmentation is much faster and easier. It has gained the Royal Horticultural Society's Award of Garden Merit.

== Invasive plant ==
U. sandersonii is listed on the New Zealand National Pest Plant Accord since it is an invasive species.

== See also ==
- List of Utricularia species
