= Genlisea margaretae =

Scientific classification
- Kingdom: Plantae
- Clade: Tracheophytes
- Clade: Angiosperms
- Clade: Eudicots
- Clade: Asterids
- Order: Lamiales
- Family: Lentibulariaceae
- Genus: Genlisea
- Subgenus: Genlisea subg. Genlisea
- Species: G. margaretae

Binomial name
- Genlisea margaretae Hutch. (1946)

Synonyms
- Genlisea recurva Bosser (1959)

Species of carnivorous plant

Genlisea margaretae is a carnivorous species in the genus Genlisea (family Lentibulariaceae) native to areas of Madagascar, Tanzania, and Zambia. It has pale bundles of root-like organs up to about 20 cm long under ground that attract, trap, and digest protozoans. These organs are subterranean leaves, which lack chlorophyll. It had been known to possess the smallest known genome of any flowering plant as of 2006, but was later surpassed by the related species Genlisea tuberosa.

== Characteristics ==
Genlisea margaretae is a perennial herb that forms small, compact rosettes composed of nearly linear leaves about 2 mm wide. Leaves are typically 5–50 mm in length, but most of that length, including the petiole, is hidden beneath the soil. It has no true roots and instead has highly modified subterranean leaves that act as the carnivorous trapping mechanism.

The inflorescences, which can grow to be 20–60 cm tall, emerge from the center of the rosette and produce mauve or violet-colored flowers. Each inflorescence can produce more than 10 flowers on a congested raceme. The upper part of the inflorescences is densely covered with glandular trichomes while the lower part has fewer trichomes and is often glabrous. Individual flowers have rounded upper lips on the corolla instead of being lobed and a relatively straight spur.

The genomes of several species in the genus Genlisea were studied in 2006 along with other members of the Lentibulariaceae family. According to the study, prior to its publication the smallest known angiosperm (flowering plant) genome was that of Arabidopsis thaliana at 157 Megabase pairs (Mbp). With a diploid chromosome number of around 40 (2n = ca. 40), G. margaretae held the distinction of having the smallest known angiosperm genome size at 63.4 Mbp, just 0.2 Mbp lower than that of Genlisea aurea. Further research in 2014 found that a related species, Genlisea tuberosa has a smaller genome size at around 61 Mbp. The smallest individual chromatids from mitotic anaphase are just 2.1 Mbp and therefore have a size smaller than some bacterial chromosomes, such as the approximate 4 Mbp of Escherichia coli. G. margaretae and G. aurea also both appear to be polyploid species with the unusual circumstances of having a high chromosome number with extremely small chromosomes. Other species in the genus Genlisea and the family Lentibulariaceae have much lower chromosome numbers and larger genome sizes, affirming that one characteristic of this botanic family is rapid molecular evolution. G. margaretae in particular may be helpful in research aimed at understanding the mechanisms behind genome downsizing.

At least one natural hybrid among the African species that involves G. margaretae has been described. Genlisea margaretae × glandulosissima is a product of G. margaretae and G. glandulosissima.

== Distribution and habitat ==
Genlisea margaretae is one of the several Genlisea species native to Southeast Africa. It has been discovered in Tanzania and Zambia and is the only Genlisea species reported to exist in Madagascar. Its typical oligotrophous habitat includes inselbergs, ferricretes, and swamps.

== Carnivory ==
Genlisea margaretae, like all Genlisea species, is a carnivorous plant that attracts, traps, kills, and digests prey, which are typically protozoans. Evidence of this behavior had been postulated ever since Charles Darwin's time and has mostly relied on circumstantial findings of the occasional dead aquatic invertebrate in the utricle (digestion chamber). In 1975, however, British botanist Yolande Heslop-Harrison discovered digestive enzyme activity in G. africana. Later, in 1998, Wilhelm Barthlott and his colleagues concluded through experimentation that Genlisea attracts prey chemotactically, traps them in the corkscrew "lobster pot" trap, digests them with enzymes produced by the plant, and then absorbs the nutrients. This study represented the first conclusive evidence that G. margaretae was carnivorous.

== Cultivation ==
According to Barry Rice in his 2006 book on carnivorous plants, G. margaretae is an easy terrestrial species to grow. Leaf and trap cuttings can easily produce new plant clones. G. margaretae requires high humidity and medium to bright lighting conditions with soil composition similar to that of other carnivorous plants, especially the terrestrial Utricularia species.
