= Genlisea tuberosa =

Scientific classification
- Kingdom: Plantae
- Clade: Tracheophytes
- Clade: Angiosperms
- Clade: Eudicots
- Clade: Asterids
- Order: Lamiales
- Family: Lentibulariaceae
- Genus: Genlisea
- Subgenus: Genlisea subg. Genlisea
- Species: G. tuberosa

Binomial name
- Genlisea tuberosa Rivadavia, Gonella & A.Fleischm.

Species of carnivorous plant

Genlisea tuberosa is a carnivorous species in the genus Genlisea (family Lentibulariaceae) that is endemic to Brazil and found only in campos rupestres vegetation. Lacking any roots, it has unpigmented bundles of "rootlike" subterranean organs, technically leaves, which attract, trap, and digest protozoans. This species is unique in the genus in its formation of tubers. As of 2014, Genlisea tuberosa has the smallest known genome of any flowering plant, at 61 Mbp, or 61,000,000 base pairs.

== Distribution and habitat ==
Genlisea tuberosa is endemic to Brazil where it is found only in the campos rupestres vegetation in the Brazilian states of Bahia, Goiás, Distrito Federal, and Minas Gerais. It grows in fast-draining sandy soils in seasonally wet areas from 800 to 1,500 m (2,600 to 4,900 ft) altitude. It can be found growing in the presence of other species of Genlisea, including G. aurea, G. filiformis, and G. violacea, and among Utricularia, Drosera, and some grasses. Genlisea tuberosa flowers from February to June in its native habitat and enters dormancy during the winter dry season.

== Genome ==
The genomes of several species in the genus Genlisea were studied in 2006 along with other members of the Lentibulariaceae family. According to the study, prior to its publication the smallest known angiosperm (flowering plant) genome was that of Arabidopsis thaliana at 157 Megabase pairs (Mbp). This 2006 report identified the related species G. margaretae as having the smallest known angiosperm genome size at 63.4 Mbp, just 0.2 Mbp lower than that of Genlisea aurea. Further research in 2014 found that the recently described Genlisea tuberosa has the smallest angiosperm genome known at around 61 Mbp.

== Botanical history ==
Genlisea tuberosa was first discovered by the carnivorous plant specialist Thomas Carow in the late 1980s near the town of Diamantina in Minas Gerais, Brazil. Carow, however, identified the specimens he examined as Genlisea pygmaea. The new species was later rediscovered by Fernando Rivadavia in 2007 and formally described by Rivadavia, Paulo Minatel Gonella, and Andreas Fleischmann in a 2013 issue of the journal Systematic Botany.
