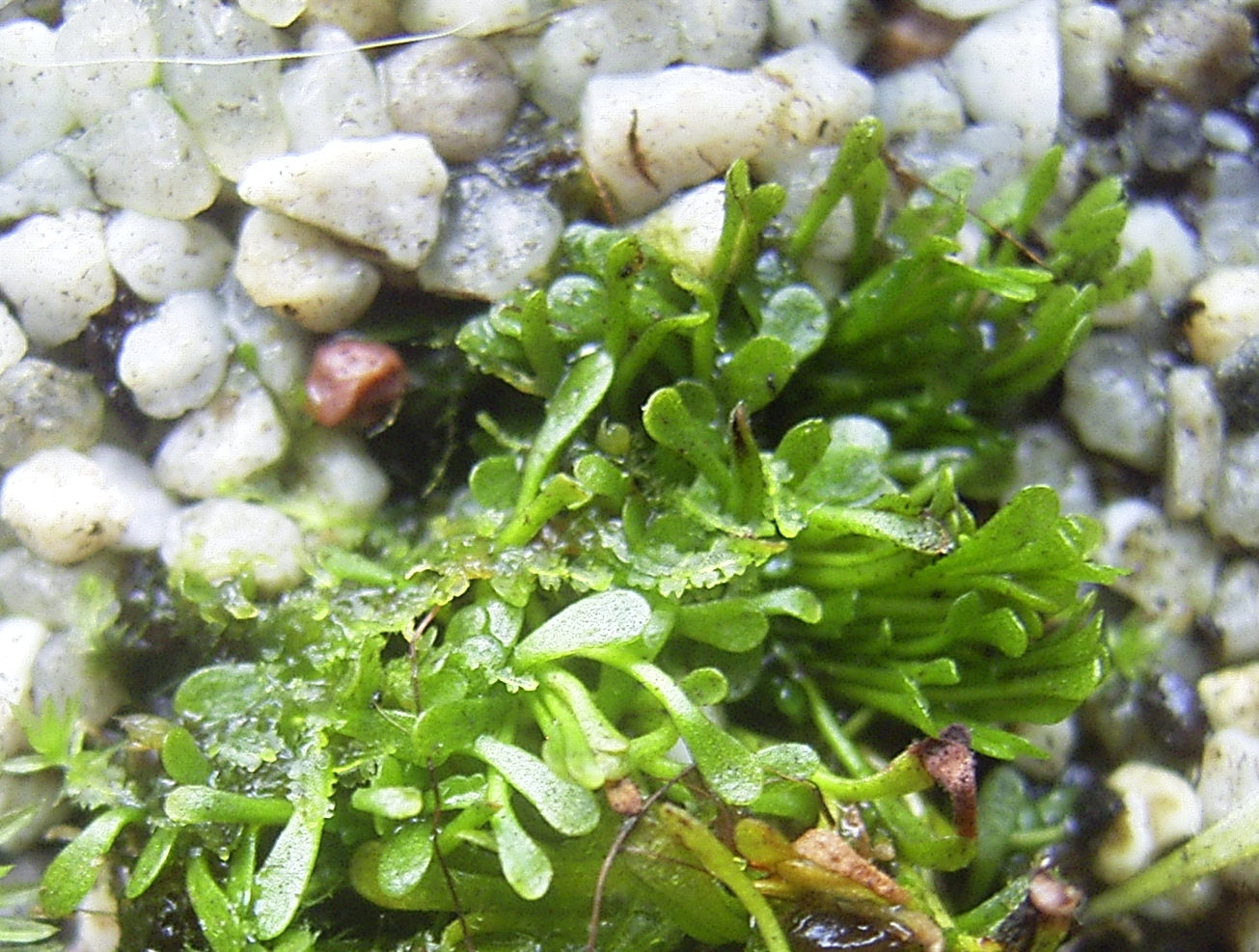

Scientific classification
- Kingdom: Plantae
- Clade: Tracheophytes
- Clade: Angiosperms
- Clade: Eudicots
- Clade: Asterids
- Order: Lamiales
- Family: Lentibulariaceae
- Genus: Genlisea
- Subgenus: Genlisea subg. Genlisea
- Species: G. aurea

Binomial name
- Genlisea aurea A.St.-Hil. (1833)

Synonyms
- Genlisea minor A.St.-Hil. (1833); Genlisea ornata Mart. ex Benj. (1847); Genlisea ornata var. gracilis Merl ex Luetz. (1923) nom.nud.; Utricularia superba G.Weber ex Benj. (1847) nom.illeg.

= Genlisea aurea =

Species of carnivorous plant

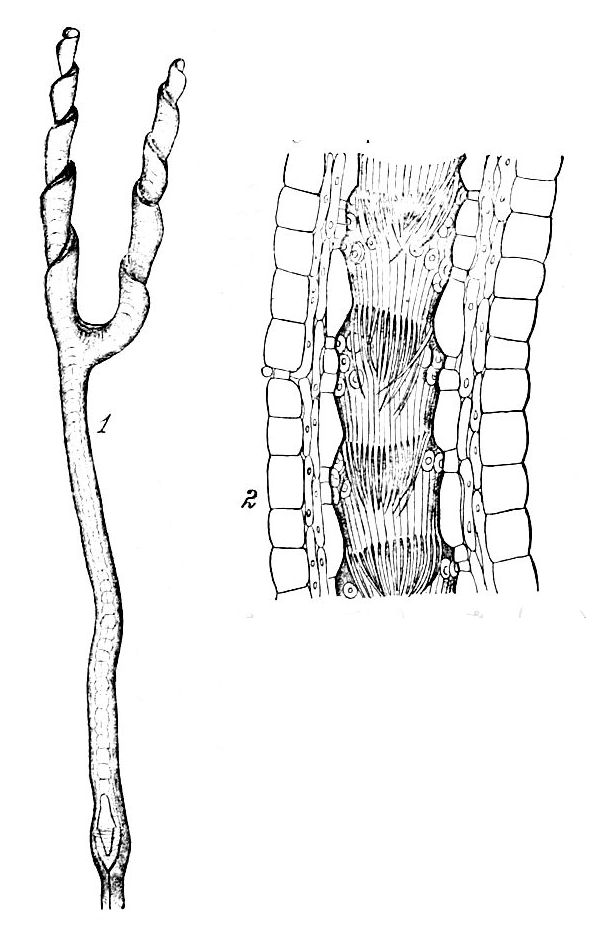
1. Spirally coiled tube-leaf of Genlisea aurea 2. Longitudinal section of tube showing retrorse hairs

Genlisea aurea is one of the largest carnivorous species in the genus Genlisea (family Lentibulariaceae). It has pale bundles of root-like organs up to about 15 cm long under ground that attract, trap, and digest protozoans. These organs are subterranean leaves, which lack chlorophyll. G. aurea is endemic to Brazil, where it grows with several other species of Genlisea. It possesses an exceptionally small genome for a flowering plant.

== Characteristics ==
Genlisea aurea is a perennial herb that forms small, compact rosettes composed of nearly linear leaves about 2 mm wide. Leaves are typically 5–50 mm in length, but most of that length, including the petiole, is hidden beneath the soil. The rosettes can grow to be as big as 5 cm wide. It has no true roots and instead has highly modified subterranean leaves that act as the carnivorous trapping mechanism.

The up to 40 cm tall inflorescence produces one to three flowers at its apex that are typically 15–20 mm long and are the largest of the yellow-flowered species. Each inflorescence can produce up to a total of eleven flowers. In its natural habitat, G. aurea can be found flowering year-round. The flowers and the scapes are densely covered in glandular trichomes.

The genomes of several species in the genus Genlisea were studied in 2006. According to the study, prior to its publication the smallest known angiosperm (flowering plant) genome was that of Arabidopsis thaliana at 157 Megabase pairs (Mbp). With a diploid chromosome number of around 52 (2n = ca. 52), G. aurea has the distinction of having one of the smallest known angiosperm genome size at 63.6 Mbp. The smallest individual chromatids from mitotic anaphase are just 2.1 Mbp and therefore have a size smaller than some bacterial chromosomes, such as the approximate 4 Mbp of Escherichia coli. Genlisea tuberosa has the smallest known angiosperm genome as of 2014 at around 61 Mbp.

== Distribution and habitat ==
Genlisea aurea is endemic to Brazil from the states of Mato Grosso in the west to northeastern Bahia and down to Santa Catarina in the southeast. It typically grows on sandstone highlands at altitudes from 550 m to 2550 m. Its preferred substrate is a black humus-rich soil, which is sometimes mixed with sand. G. aurea lives among grasses in water-logged seepages. The rosettes are usually submerged under water or produce a layer of mucilage that remains in the cup formed by the dense rosette.

Of all other Genlisea species, G. pygmaea is the most closely related when considering morphological characteristics. It differs slightly in habitat by preferring sandier soils and in morphology by possessing smaller flowers and fewer leaves.

== Carnivory ==
Genlisea aurea, like all Genlisea species, is a carnivorous plant that attracts, traps, kills, and digests prey, which are typically protozoans. Evidence of this behavior had been postulated ever since Charles Darwin's time and has mostly relied on circumstantial findings of the occasional dead aquatic invertebrate in the utricle (digestion chamber). In 1975, however, British botanist Yolande Heslop-Harrison discovered digestive enzyme activity in G. africana. Later, in 1998, Wilhelm Barthlott and his colleagues concluded through experimentation that Genlisea attracts prey chemotactically, traps them in the corkscrew "lobster pot" trap, digests them with enzymes produced by the plant, and then absorbs the nutrients. This study represented the first conclusive evidence that G. aurea was carnivorous.

== Botanical history ==
Genlisea aurea was initially discovered and described by Augustin Saint-Hilaire in 1833 with four other Brazilian species. Darwin took note of G. aurea in his 1875 manuscript, Insectivorous Plants. Recent study has focused on the carnivorous nature of G. aurea. At least two published sources note the variety within the species and genus and are optimistic that additional species will be located.
