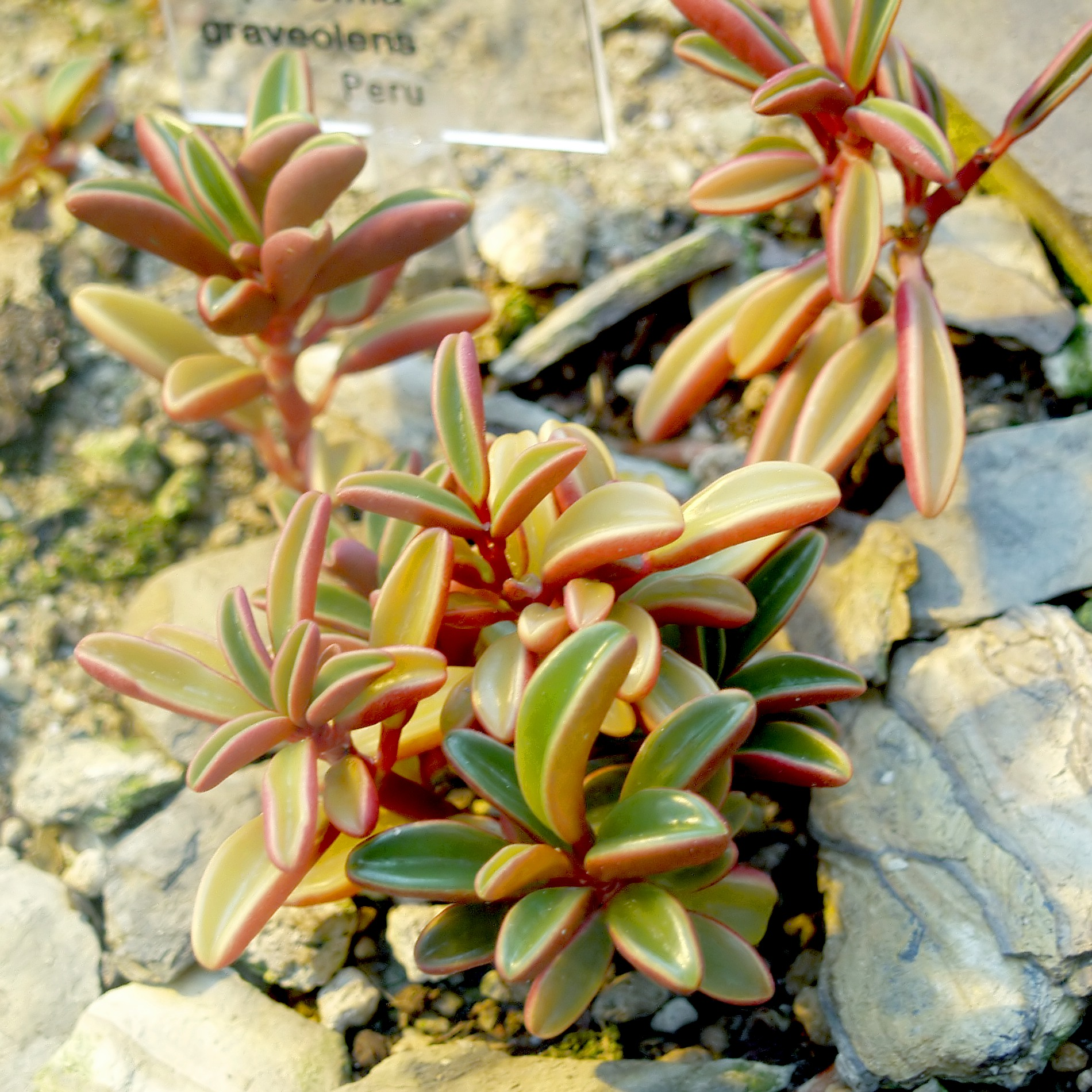

Conservation status
- Vulnerable (IUCN 3.1)

Scientific classification
- Kingdom: Plantae
- Clade: Tracheophytes
- Clade: Angiosperms
- Clade: Magnoliids
- Order: Piperales
- Family: Piperaceae
- Genus: Peperomia
- Species: P. graveolens

Binomial name
- Peperomia graveolens Rauh & Barthlott

= Peperomia graveolens =

Species of flowering plant

Peperomia graveolens, commonly known as Ruby Glow, is a species of plant in the genus Peperomia of the family Piperaceae. It is endemic to Ecuador.

== Description ==
Peperomia graveolens is a short stemmed plant with few thick and round reddish stems with persistent 2–3 cm long succulent obtuse leaves. The underside of leaves is burgundy red while the top-side has a V-shaped epidermal window showing the light green inside of the leaf. The plant is rare among Peperomia, which typically feature inflorescence with no noticeable scent, in that its flowers emit an intense foul smell, like that of mouse urine.
