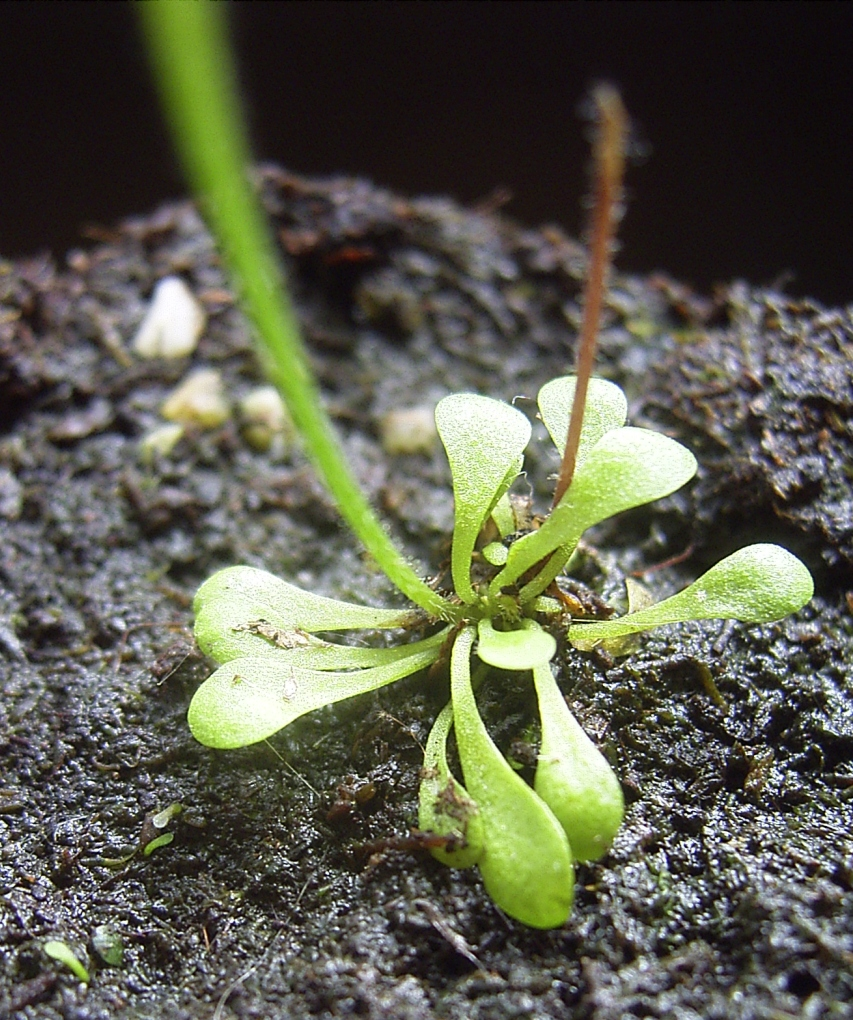

Scientific classification
- Kingdom: Plantae
- Clade: Tracheophytes
- Clade: Angiosperms
- Clade: Eudicots
- Clade: Asterids
- Order: Lamiales
- Family: Lentibulariaceae
- Genus: Genlisea
- Subgenus: Genlisea subg. Tayloria
- Species: G. lobata

Binomial name
- Genlisea lobata Fromm (1989)

= Genlisea lobata =

Species of carnivorous plant

Genlisea lobata is a corkscrew plant native to Brazil.
