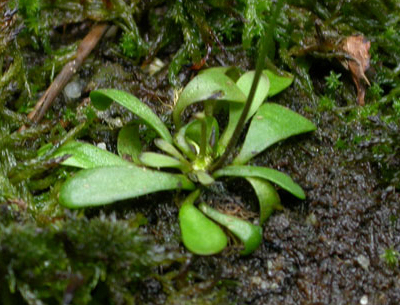

Scientific classification
- Kingdom: Plantae
- Clade: Tracheophytes
- Clade: Angiosperms
- Clade: Eudicots
- Clade: Asterids
- Order: Lamiales
- Family: Lentibulariaceae
- Genus: Genlisea
- Subgenus: Genlisea subg. Genlisea
- Species: G. hispidula

Binomial name
- Genlisea hispidula Stapf

= Genlisea hispidula =

Species of carnivorous plant

Genlisea hispidula is a corkscrew plant native to Africa.
