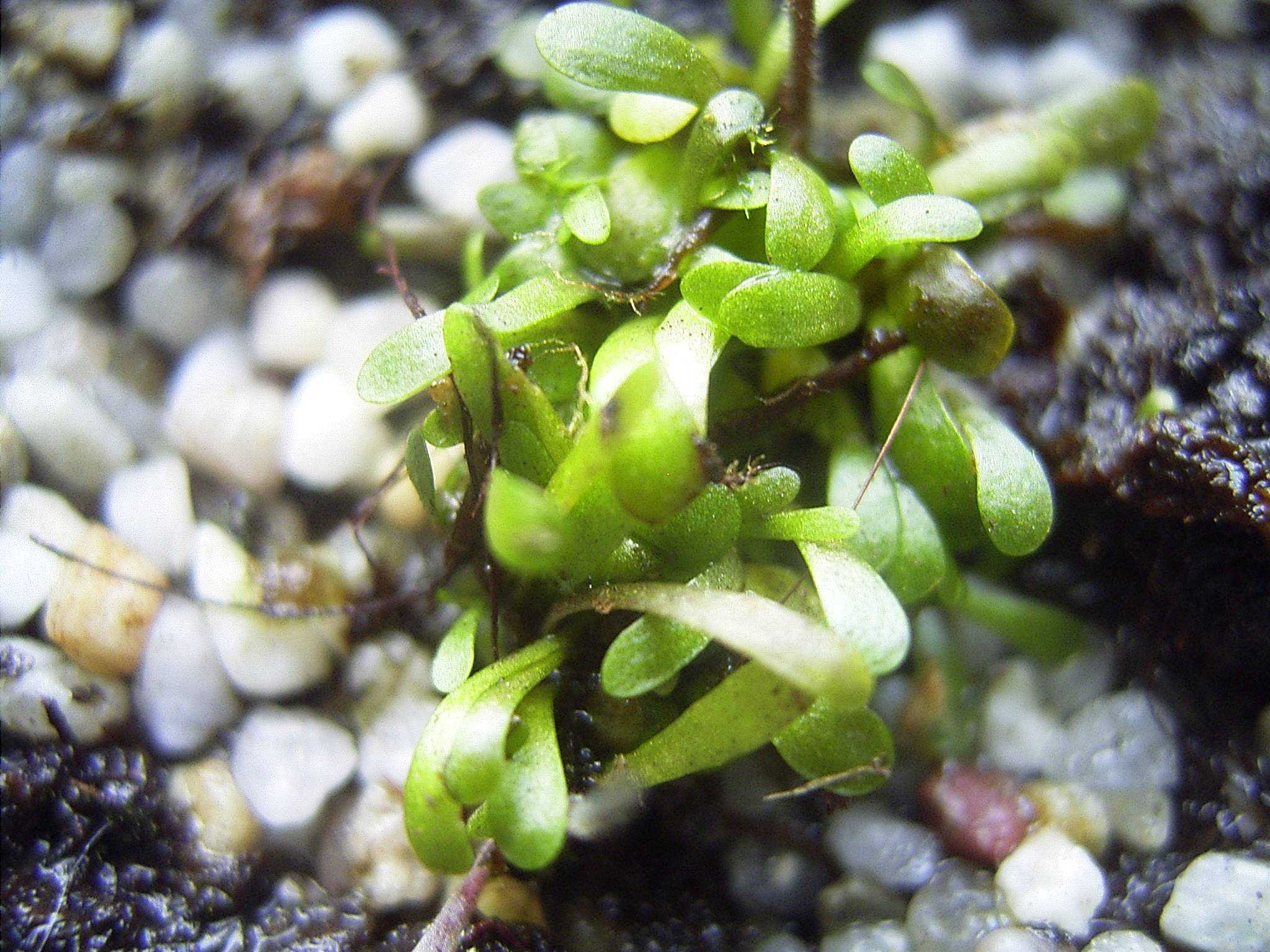

Scientific classification
- Kingdom: Plantae
- Clade: Tracheophytes
- Clade: Angiosperms
- Clade: Eudicots
- Clade: Asterids
- Order: Lamiales
- Family: Lentibulariaceae
- Genus: Genlisea
- Subgenus: Genlisea subg. Genlisea
- Species: G. repens

Binomial name
- Genlisea repens Benj. (1847)

Synonyms
- Genlisea pusilla Warm. (1874); Genlisea repens auct. non Benj.: G.Cheers (1992) [=Utricularia quelchii]; Utricularia obovata G.Weber ex Benj. (1847)

= Genlisea repens =

Species of carnivorous plant

Genlisea repens is a corkscrew plant native to South America.
