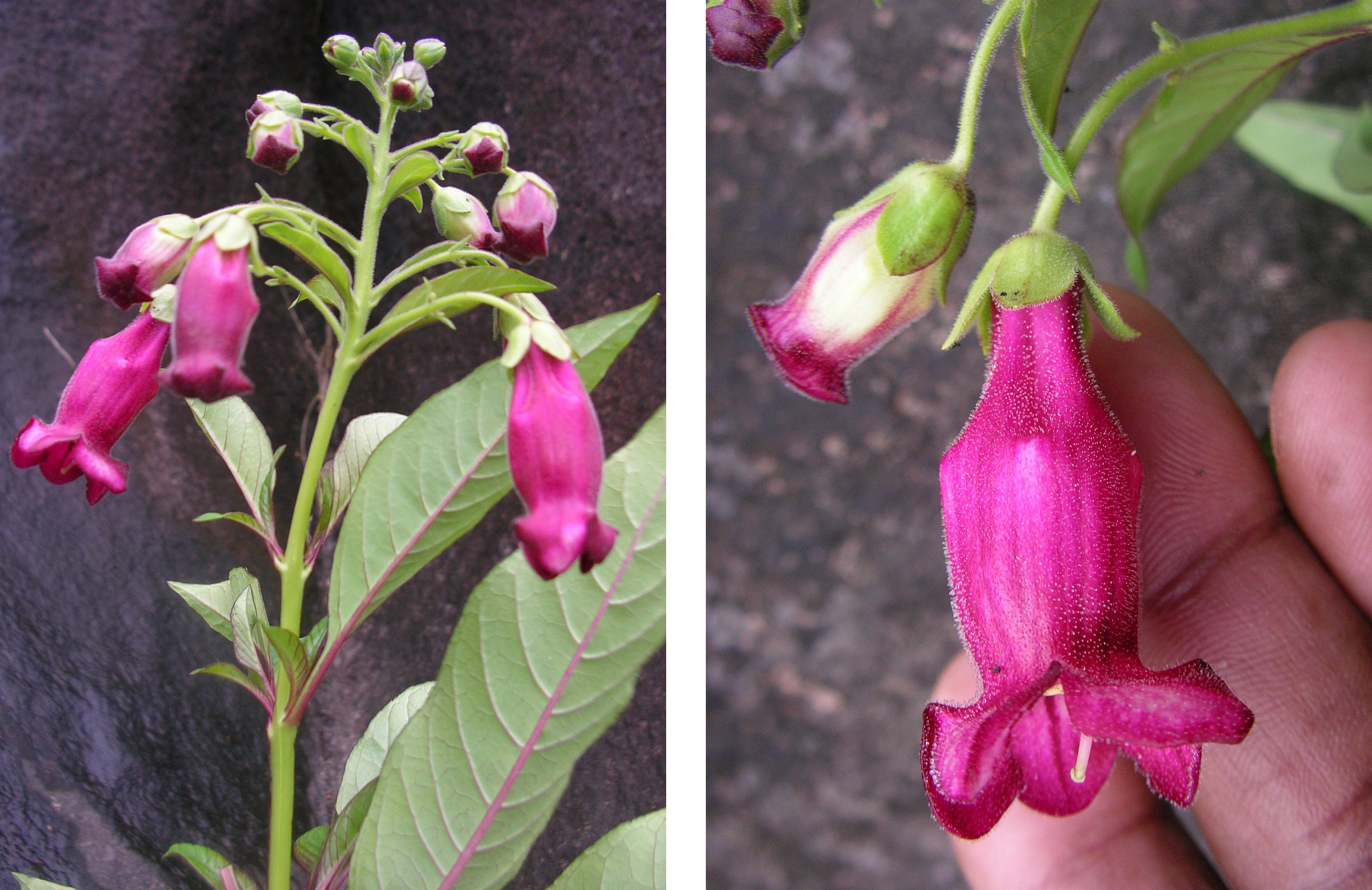
- Barthlottia madagascariensis: Inflorescence and solitary flower at the type locality in Madagascar - Fotos Charles Rakotovao, Tropicos ®

Scientific classification
- Kingdom: Plantae
- Clade: Tracheophytes
- Clade: Angiosperms
- Clade: Eudicots
- Clade: Asterids
- Order: Lamiales
- Family: Scrophulariaceae
- Tribe: Limoselleae
- Genus: Barthlottia; Eb.Fisch.
- Species: B. madagascariensis

Binomial name
- Barthlottia madagascariensis Eb.Fisch.

= Barthlottia =

Genus of flowering plants

Barthlottia madagascariensis is the only species in the genus Barthlottia of flowering plants in the family Scrophulariaceae. The large shrub with conspicuous purple flowers is native to a very restricted area in southeast Madagascar and was described in 1996.

== Description ==
Shrubs are up to 3 m. The elliptic-lanceolate opposite leaves are up to 15 cm long. Terminal inflorescences have up to 15 conspicuous 5-lobed bell shaped flowers, which are up to 4 cm long and purplish-red.

== Habitat and history ==
Madagascar is rich in species, which only inhabit this island (endemics). Barthlottia is such an endemic species and only occurs in a region of about 30 x 30 km in SW Madagascar, about 45 km NW of Tolagnaro (Ft. Dauphin) on Inselbergs and rock outcrops (Fischer & Theisen 2000) on the Anosy mountains. The sites are mostly located within the Andohahela National Park (Unesco World Heritage).

The restricted and remote habitat is probably the reason why till today only less than six collections of Barthlottia are known. The rather conspicuous plant was collected for the first time in 1947 by the French botanist Jean-Henri Humbert, but remained unrecognized in the herbarium of the Musée d´Histoire Naturelle in Paris. Later in 1996 Barthlottia was finally described by the German botanist Eberhard Fischer as a new genus and species. It was named in honor of the botanist and biomimetics scientist Wilhelm Barthlott, who had been interested in the Vegetation of the Inselbergs of Madagascar. E. Fischer discovered over the last decades many new species, under them the world smallest waterlily (Nymphaea thermarum).

== Taxonomy ==
Barthlottia belongs to the tribe Limoselleae (former Manuleae) within the foxglove family Scrophulariaceae. Molecular and pollen data confirm the relatively isolated systematic position. Barthlottia seems to have no closer relatives in Madagascar and resembles distantly the Namibian Manuelopsis dinteri.
