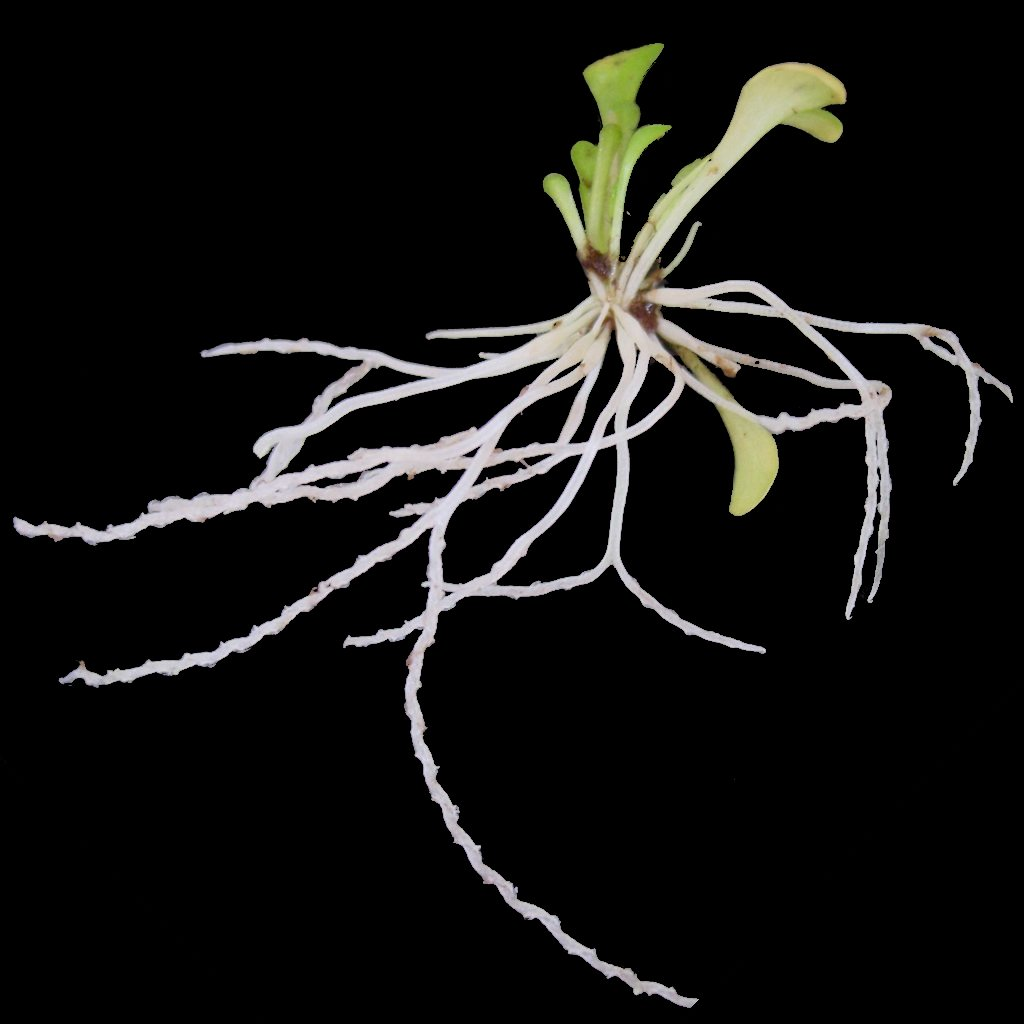
- Genlisea violacea leaves: green above-ground leaves and colorless underground trap leaves

Scientific classification
- Kingdom: Plantae
- Clade: Tracheophytes
- Clade: Angiosperms
- Clade: Eudicots
- Clade: Asterids
- Order: Lamiales
- Family: Lentibulariaceae
- Genus: Genlisea; A.St.-Hil. (1833)

Subgenera and sections
- Genlisea subg. Genlisea; Genlisea sect. Genlisea; Genlisea sect. Africanae A.Fleischm., Kai Müll., Barthlott & Eb.Fisch.; Genlisea sect. Recurvatae A.Fleischm., Kai Müll., Barthlott & Eb.Fisch.; Genlisea subg. Tayloria (Fromm) Eb.Fisch., S.Porembski & Barthlott
- Global distribution of Genlisea

= Genlisea =

Genus of carnivorous plants

Genlisea (/ˌdʒɛnlɪˈsiːə/ JEN-liss-EE-ə) is a genus of carnivorous plants also known as corkscrew plants. The 30 or so species grow in wet terrestrial to semi-aquatic environments distributed throughout Africa and Central and South America. The plants use highly modified underground leaves to attract, trap and digest minute microfauna, particularly protozoans. Although suggested a century earlier by Charles Darwin, carnivory in the genus was not proven until 1998.

The generic name Genlisea honors the French writer and educator Stéphanie Félicité Ducrest de St-Albin, comtesse de Genlis.

Several species in the genus, including G. margaretae, G. aurea, and G. tuberosa, possess the smallest known genomes of all flowering plants.

As stated, Genlisea has a wide range of genetic diversity which can be shown in various phenotypic traits. For example, G. tuberosa develops tubers, one to three occurring per plant. This allows for carbohydrate and water storage as it is found in areas prone to fire. Other species present with a thickened stolon.

== Description ==
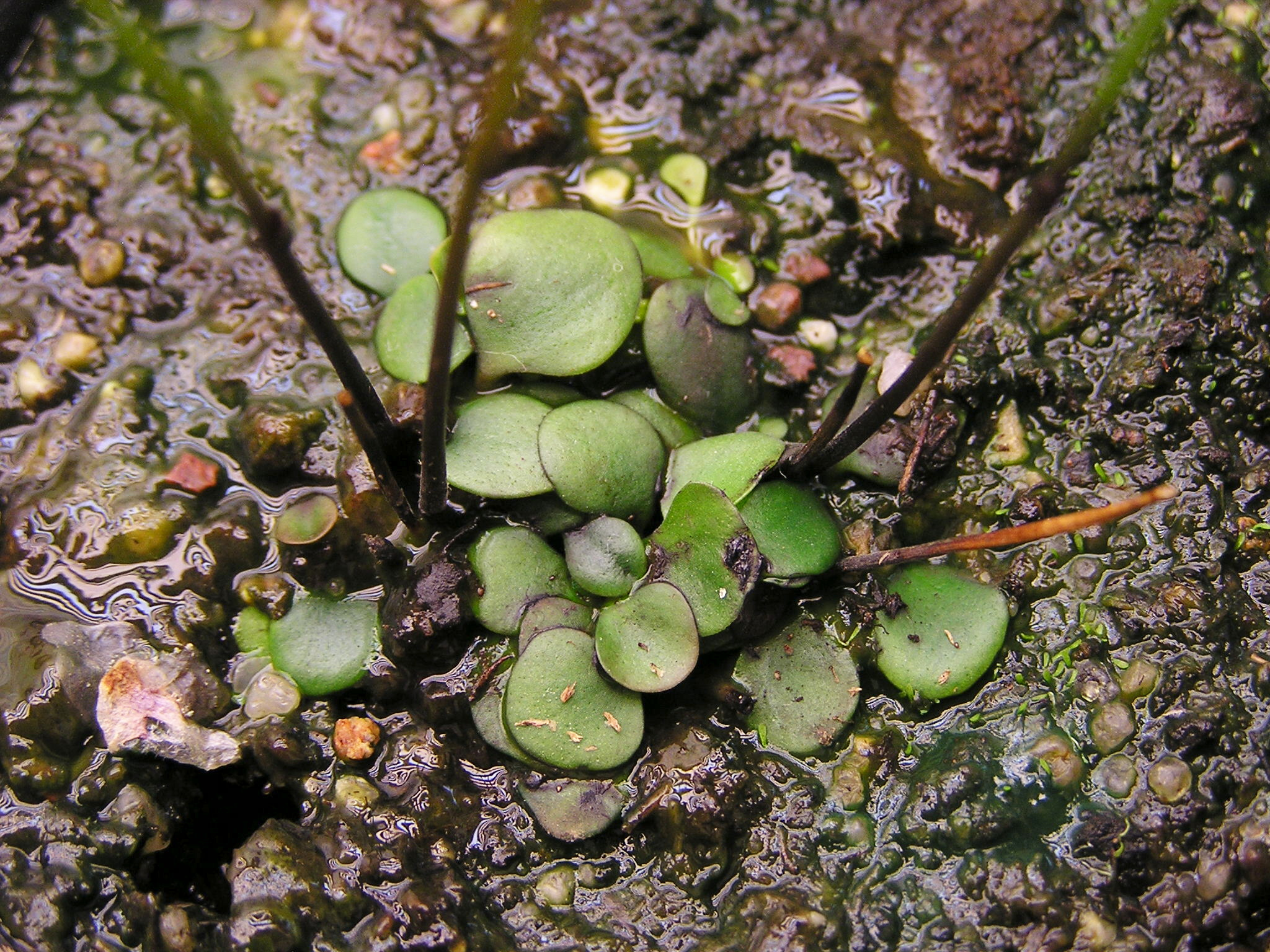
Genlisea subglabra leaves

Genlisea are small herbs, growing from a slender rhizome and bearing two morphologically distinct leaf types—photosynthetic foliage leaves aboveground and highly modified subterranean leaves used to trap prey. The plants lack roots, although the subterranean traps perform many of the functions normally performed by roots, such as anchorage and absorption of water and nutrients.

Several to many flowers are held by a slender, erect, and often tall inflorescence. As in other members of the bladderwort family, the corolla is fused into a bilobed tube tapering to a spur, with the lower lip of the corolla having three lobes. The calyx is five-lobed, in contrast to Utricularia's three-lobed calyx. Corolla colors are generally yellow or violet to mauve, although a few species are white or cream. The lower lip forms a palate that functions as the guide to the spur that contains the nectar by providing olfactory and mechanical stimuli for nearby pollinators like bees and flies. At a microscopic level, the palate has glandular trichomes, which are small hairs that store and secrete secondary metabolites in order to provide protection from herbivory. The glandular trichomes contain no nectar secretion, suggesting that they are scent glands. These above ground structures are not shown to be directly participating in carnivorous activities.

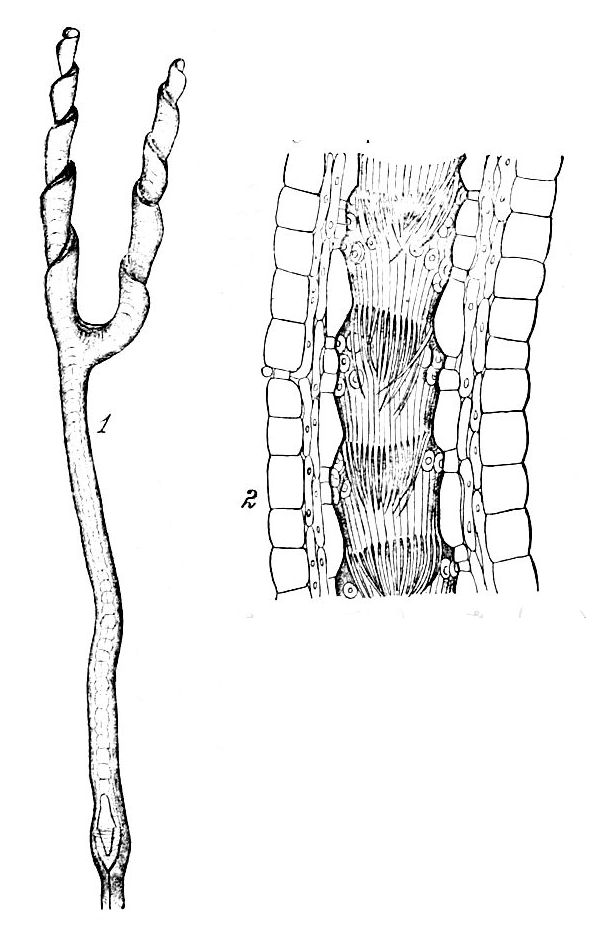
Plate from "Handbuch der Systematischen Botanik", 1. Spirally coiled tube-leaf of Genlisea aurea 2. Longitudinal section of tube, showing retrorse hairs

Depending on species, the photosynthetic leaves are linear to spatulate in shape and 0.5–5 cm (1/4–2 in) in length.

The subterranean traps are white, lacking chlorophyll or any other pigmentation. They consist of a cylindrical stalk, widening at some distance below the surface into a hollow bulb-like utricle, and continuing as a hollow cylinder some further distance. At this point the stalk bifurcates into two furrowed spirals, between which the cylinder opening acts as the trap entrance. The furrows of the spiraled trap arms are lined with hairs pointing inward and toward the bifurcation. The hollow cylinder section leading from the bifurcation to the utricle is likewise lined with upward-pointing curved hairs. Some species produce two trap forms, one shorter and one longer, which probably target different prey groups. These corkscrew-like structures passively capture protozoa and other metazoa. Since these traps occur in soil, they are continuously stimulated due to the vast microfauna found in the soil. Due to continuous stimulation, the plant actively secretes digestive enzymes in order to aid with digestion to gain more nitrogen, phosphorus, and other minerals. Phosphatase has been detected in all types of glands, allowing for the breakdown of prey and uptake of phosphorus in low-nutrient soils. Although not completely understood, the oxygen concentration inside Genlisea traps is negligible. For this reason, it is thought that anoxic conditions could be the mechanisms in which prey are killed. At the same time, anaerobic bacteria survive.

== Taxonomy ==
Twenty-nine species are currently recognised in the genus. Two varieties are also considered valid: G. aurea var. minor and the autonymous G. aurea var. aurea. Intraspecific determination depends almost wholly upon the inflorescence, particularly upon the indumentum. Genetic variation is an interesting area of attention as it has an incredible high rate of nucleotide substitution rates across nucleus, chloroplast, and mitochondria when compared to other angiosperms. Due to a mutation leading to changes in phenotypic traits found in the mitochondria, reactive oxygen species are produced which ultimately lead to DNA damage and further mutations.

Species	Authority	Year	Image	Distribution	Subgenus	Section	Genome size (Mbp)
Genlisea africana	Oliv.	1865		Africa	Genlisea	Africanae	740
Genlisea angolensis	R.D.Good	1924		Africa	Genlisea	Africanae	-
Genlisea aurea	A.St.-Hil.	1833		South America	Genlisea	Genlisea	64 & 117 - 131
Genlisea barthlottii	S.Porembski, Eb.Fisch. & Gemmel	1996		Africa	Genlisea	Africanae	-
Genlisea exhibitionista	Rivadavia & A.Fleischm.	2011		South America	Tayloria	-	
Genlisea filiformis	A.St.-Hil.	1833		South America, Central America, Cuba	Genlisea	Genlisea	-
Genlisea flexuosa	Rivadavia, A.Fleischm. & Gonella	2011		South America	Tayloria	-	-
Genlisea glabra	P.Taylor	1967		South America	Genlisea	Genlisea	-
Genlisea glandulosissima	R.E.Fr.	1916		Africa	Genlisea	Recurvatae	154-189
Genlisea guianensis	N.E.Br.	1900		South America	Genlisea	Genlisea	289
Genlisea hispidula	Stapf	1904		Africa	Genlisea	Africanae	1510 - 1550
Genlisea lobata	Fromm	1989		South America	Tayloria	-	1200 - 1722
Genlisea margaretae	Hutch.	1946		Africa, Madagascar	Genlisea	Recurvatae	113 - 195
Genlisea metallica	Rivadavia & A.Fleischm.	2011		South America	Tayloria	-	1057
Genlisea nebulicola	Rivadavia, Gonella & A.Fleischm.	2011		South America	Tayloria	-	-
Genlisea nigrocaulis	Steyerm.	1948		South America	Genlisea	Genlisea	73 - 86
Genlisea oligophylla	Rivadavia & A.Fleischm.	2011		South America	Tayloria	-	-
Genlisea oxycentron	P.Taylor	1954		South America, Trinidad	Genlisea	Genlisea	75
Genlisea pallida	Fromm & P.Taylor	1985		Africa	Genlisea	Recurvatae	-
Genlisea pulchella	Tutin	1934		South America	Genlisea	Genlisea	-
Genlisea pygmaea	A.St.-Hil.	1833		South America	Genlisea	Genlisea	161 - 179
Genlisea repens	Benj.	1847		South America	Genlisea	Genlisea	77 - 86 & 142 - 150
Genlisea roraimensis	N.E.Br.	1901		South America	Genlisea	Genlisea	-
Genlisea sanariapoana	Steyerm.	1953		South America	Genlisea	Genlisea	-
Genlisea stapfii	A.Chev.	1912		Africa	Genlisea	Africanae	-
Genlisea subglabra	Stapf	1906		Africa	Genlisea	Africanae	1471 - 1622
Genlisea tuberosa	Rivadavia, Gonella & A.Fleischm.	2013		South America	Genlisea	Genlisea	61
Genlisea uncinata	P.Taylor & Fromm	1983		South America	Tayloria	-	995 - 1062
Genlisea violacea	A.St.-Hil.	1833		South America	Tayloria	-	1005 - 1609

== Botanical history ==
The genus was discovered by Augustin François César Prouvençal de Saint-Hilaire, who in 1833 described four species: G. aurea, G. filiformis, G. pygmaea, and G. violacea.

== Genome size range ==
The genus has a 25-fold range in genome size among its species and notably includes some of the smallest known plant genomes. For example, the genome of G. nigrocaulis is 86 Mbp (1C; 2n = 40) while that of its close relative G. hispidula (1C; 2n = 40) is 1550 Mbp, 18-fold larger. More than one genome size has been measured in G. aurea and G. repens, suggesting that di- and tetraploid individuals exist.

== Host–microbiome interactions ==
Genlisea traps host a microbe community of bacteria (dominant species consisting of anaerobic Clostridium sp. and pectolytic Dickeya sp.), green algae, microbial fungi, protists of SAR group, and minute metazoans. Through extensive research, the trap's bacterial community has been discovered as serving the ecological importance of being prey due to Genlisea plants relying on the digestive enzymatic systems from microbes in order to aid their own carnivorous digestion.
