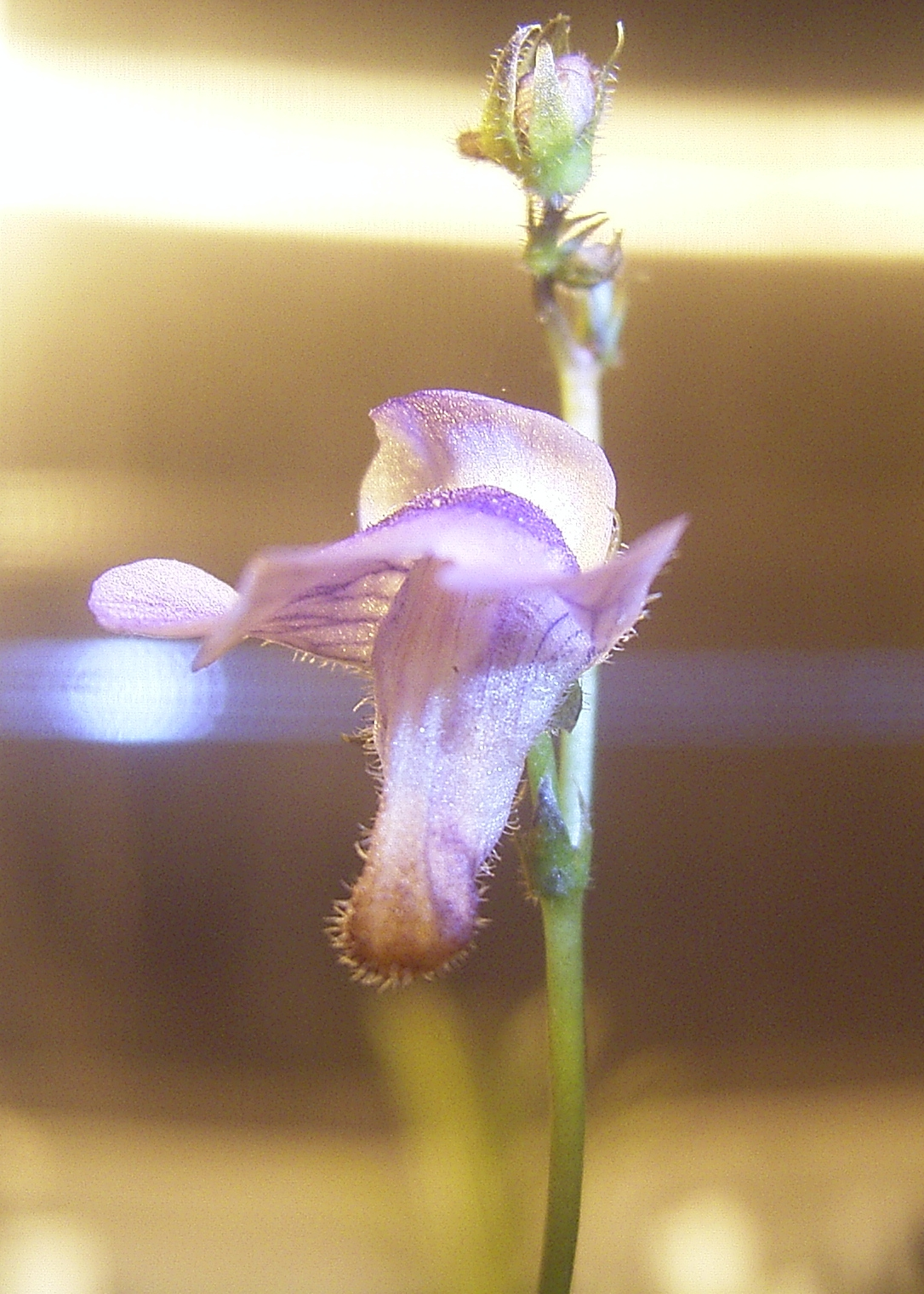

Scientific classification
- Kingdom: Plantae
- Clade: Tracheophytes
- Clade: Angiosperms
- Clade: Eudicots
- Clade: Asterids
- Order: Lamiales
- Family: Lentibulariaceae
- Genus: Genlisea
- Subgenus: Genlisea subg. Genlisea
- Species: G. subglabra

Binomial name
- Genlisea subglabra Stapf (1906)

Synonyms
- Genlisea hispidula subsp. subglabra (Stapf) P.Taylor (1972)

= Genlisea subglabra =

Species of carnivorous plant

Genlisea subglabra is a corkscrew plant native to Africa.
