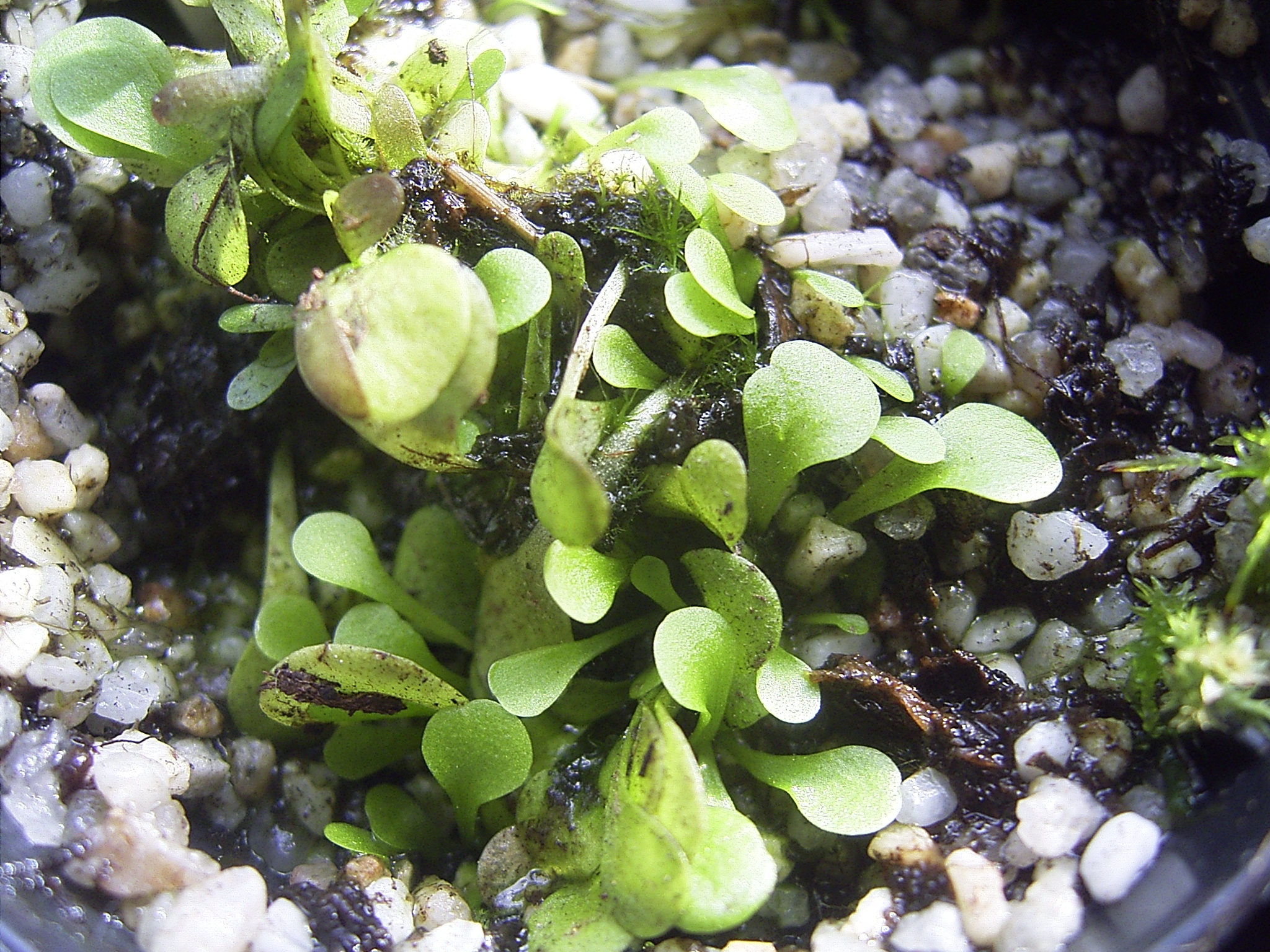

Scientific classification
- Kingdom: Plantae
- Clade: Tracheophytes
- Clade: Angiosperms
- Clade: Eudicots
- Clade: Asterids
- Order: Lamiales
- Family: Lentibulariaceae
- Genus: Genlisea
- Subgenus: Genlisea subg. Tayloria
- Species: G. violacea

Binomial name
- Genlisea violacea A.St.-Hil. (1833)

Synonyms
- Genlisea biloba Benj. (1847); Genlisea cylindrica Sylven (1909); Genlisea reflexa Benj. (1847); Utricularia glandulosa G.Weber ex Benj. (1847)

= Genlisea violacea =

Species of carnivorous plant

Genlisea violacea is a corkscrew plant native to South America.

== Physical Appearance ==
Genlisea violaceae is a small herbaceous perennial plant with a rosette growth habit. The leaves are long, slender, undersoil stolons that trap nematodes and small soil insects resemble corkscrews. Five-petaled flowers resemble viola flowers, which gives the species its name.

== Habitat and Distribution ==
Genlisea violaceae is native to certain regions of South America, including Brazil, Guyana, and Venezuela. It thrives in wetland habitats. These plants are often found growing in acidic or sandy soils with a high water table, which provides them with the necessary moisture for survival.
