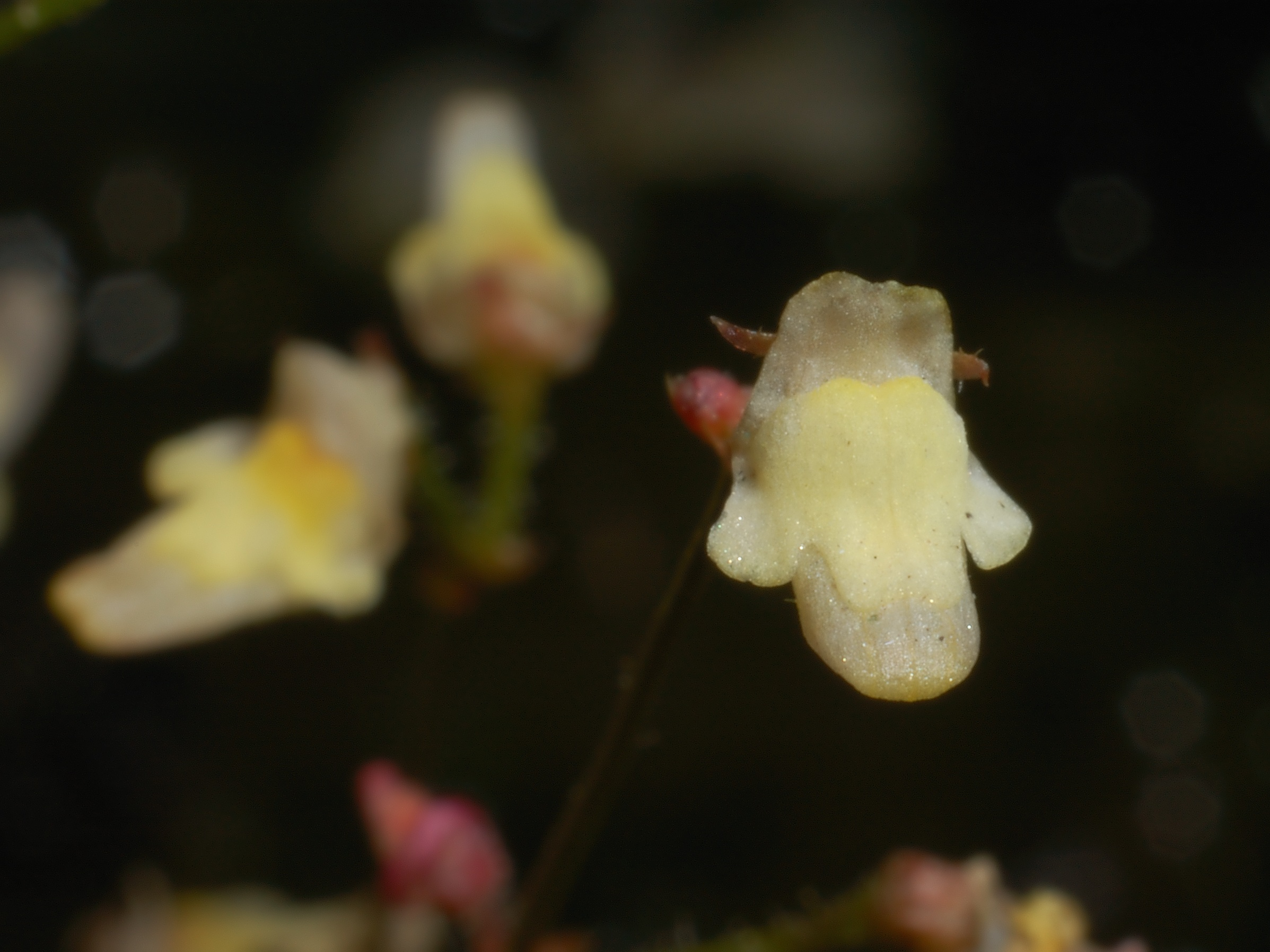

Scientific classification
- Kingdom: Plantae
- Clade: Tracheophytes
- Clade: Angiosperms
- Clade: Eudicots
- Clade: Asterids
- Order: Lamiales
- Family: Lentibulariaceae
- Genus: Genlisea
- Subgenus: Genlisea subg. Genlisea
- Species: G. filiformis

Binomial name
- Genlisea filiformis A.St.-Hil.

= Genlisea filiformis =

Species of carnivorous plant

Genlisea filiformis is a species of carnivorous plant in the genus Genlisea. It is native throughout the majority of South America, several countries in Mesoamerica, and the Caribbean.
