= Wilhelm Barthlott =

German botanist

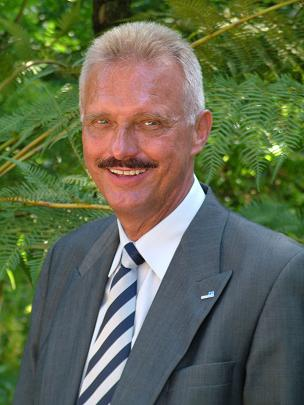
- Wilhelm Barthlott, 2008
- Born: 22 June 1946 (age 80); Forst, Germany
- Education: Heidelberg University
- Known for: The Lotus effect, Salvinia effect, and global biodiversity distribution mapping
- Notable work: See list
- Board member of: Botanical Garden, Bonn, director; Nees Institute for Biodiversity of Plants, founder
- Awards: See list
- Scientific career
- Fields: Botany, biomimetics, materials science
- Workplaces: University of Heidelberg (1968-1981); Free University of Berlin (1982-1985); University of Bonn
- Thesis: Taxonomy and Biogeography of Paleotropical Cactaceae-Rhipsalideae (1973)
- Doctoral advisor: Werner Rauh
- Author abbrev. (botany): Barthlott

Wilhelm Barthlott (born 22 June 1946 in Forst, Germany) is a German botanist and biomimetic materials scientist. His official botanical author citation is Barthlott.

Barthlott's areas of specialization are biodiversity (global distribution, assessment, and change in biodiversity) and bionics/biomimetics (in particular, superhydrophobic biological surfaces and their technical applications).

He is one of the pioneers in the field of biological and technical interfaces. Based on his systematic research on plant surfaces, he discovered the self-cleaning (lotus effect) biological surfaces and developed superhydrophobic technical surfaces for different applications (e.g. Salvinia effect and oil-water-separation). The Barthlott Effects led to a paradigm shift and disruptive technologies in material science and facilitated the development of superhydrophobic biomimetic surfaces. His map of the global biodiversity distribution is the foundation for numerous research topics. Barthlott has been honored with many awards (e. g. the German Environmental Prize) and memberships in academies (e. g. the German National Academy of Sciences Leopoldina). A large red-flowering tropical shrub, Barthlottia madagascariensis, and other plants are named after him.

== Career ==
Barthlott descends from a French Huguenot family, which arrived with Jacques Barthelot in 1698 on the territory of the Maulbronn Monastery in Germany, where his mother's family houses had existed before 1500. Wilhelm Barthlott studied biology, physics, chemistry, and geography at the University of Heidelberg, Germany. He earned his doctorate in 1973 with a dissertation supervised by Werner Rauh on systematics and biogeography of cacti investigated by means of scanning electron microscopy. He held a professorship at the Free University of Berlin at the Institute for Systematic Botany and Plant Geography from 1982 to 1985. In 1985 he became the chair of systematic botany at the Botanical Institute of the University of Bonn and also the director of the Botanical Garden. In 2003 he established the Nees Institute for Biodiversity of Plants as founding director.

Barthlott took emeritus status in 2011, and continued as the head of a long-running research project Biodiversität im Wandel (Biodiversity in Change).

Barthlott published one of the most cited papers plant science and materials science. His work in materials science based on superhydrophobic lotus effect surfaces "can be considered the most famous inspiration from nature ... and has been widely applied ... in our daily life and industrial productions".

== Fields of work ==
=== Botanical Research ===
Barthlott has done extensive research focusing on Andean South America and Africa, in particular, on the taxonomy and morphology of cacti, orchids, bromeliads and the Titan Arum, applying scanning electron microscopy and molecular methods. Barthlott's studies on carnivorous plants converged systematic and ecological research. These studies led to the discovery of the first protozoan trapping plant in the genus Genlisea. This plants also exhibit one of the highest evolutionary rates and has the smallest known genome among all flowering plants. The naming of Genlisea barthlottii pays tribute to his investigation in this regard. The shrub Barthlottia madagascariensis or the miniature titan arum (Amorphophallus barthlottii) and further species were named after him. Among his discoveries are the giant bromeliad Gregbrownia lyman-smithii and epiphytic cacti such as Rhipsalis juengeri, Pfeiffera miyagawae and Schlumbergera orssichiana or the succulent Peperomia graveolens. A complete list of plants can be found on the International Plant Names Index (IPNI) or in Plants of the World Online (POWO).

His biogeographic-ecological work was mostly conducted in South America, West Africa and Madagascar concentrating on arid regions, epiphytes in tropical forest canopy, as well as tropical inselbergs. Additional works concentrated on the global mapping of biodiversity and its macroecological dependencies on climate change and other abiotic factors (Geodiversity), including migration and globalization. His Biodiversity Distribution Map has been published in numerous textbooks and has been the foundation for many postgraduate studies. In the framework of the BMBF-BIOTA-AFRICA project, which was co-founded by him, the biodiversity patterns in Africa as a model continent were analyzed and potential impacts of climate change are investigated.

=== Bionics, biomimetics and materials science ===
Barthlott was the first botanist using high resolution scanning electron microscopy systematically in the research of biological surfaces since 1970. Most prominent among his results was the discovery of the self-cleaning effect of superhydrophobic micro- and nanostructured surfaces, which were technically realized with the trademark "Lotus Effect" from 1998 on, and resulting products distributed worldwide. The patents and the trademark Lotus Effect are owned by the company Sto-AG. Today about 2000 publications per year are based on his discovery, while the physics behind self-cleaning surfaces is still not completely understood.

Currently, the research on biological interfaces and bionics is Barthlott's central area of interest. He provided the first evidence that superhydrophobicity evolved probably as a "key innovation" for the land transition of life already in Precambrian cyanobacteria a billion years ago. Ongoing research areas include air-retaining surfaces on the model of the floating fern Salvinia, which is based on a complex physical principle (Salvinia effect). Technical application of this effect is conceivable in shipping: By means of a reduction in frictional resistance ("passive air lubrication"), a 10% decrease in fuel consumption could potentially be achieved. Another application is the oil-water-separation by adsorption and transportation of oil on air retaining surfaces. Barthlott very early warned that the addition of surfactants within the global application of pesticides in agriculture disrupts the pathogen defense of crops and should be reduced

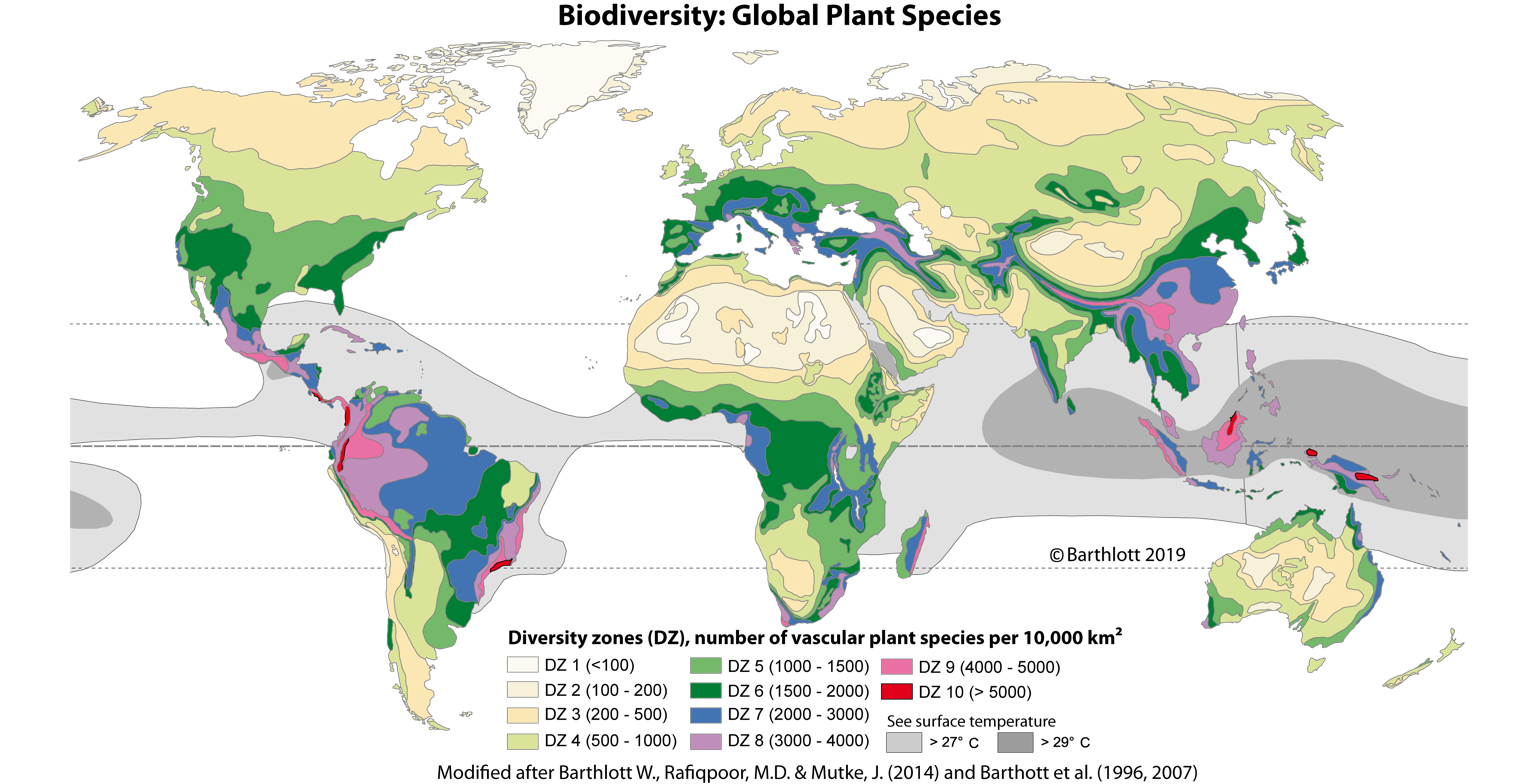
The first detailed world map of biodiversity of plants 1996 shows the global distribution of plants

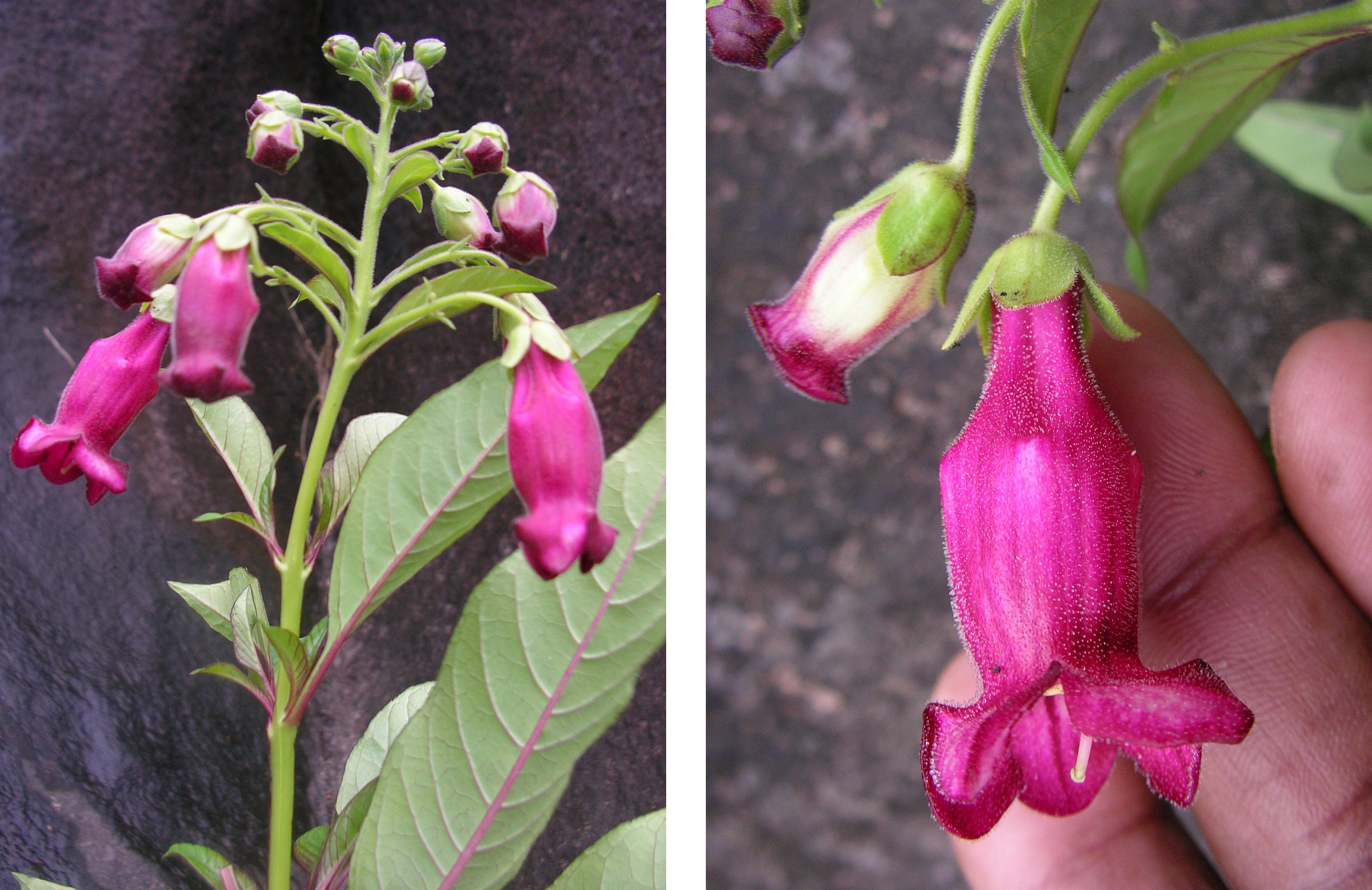
Barthlottia madagascariensis, a large shrub from the foxglove family in Madagascar

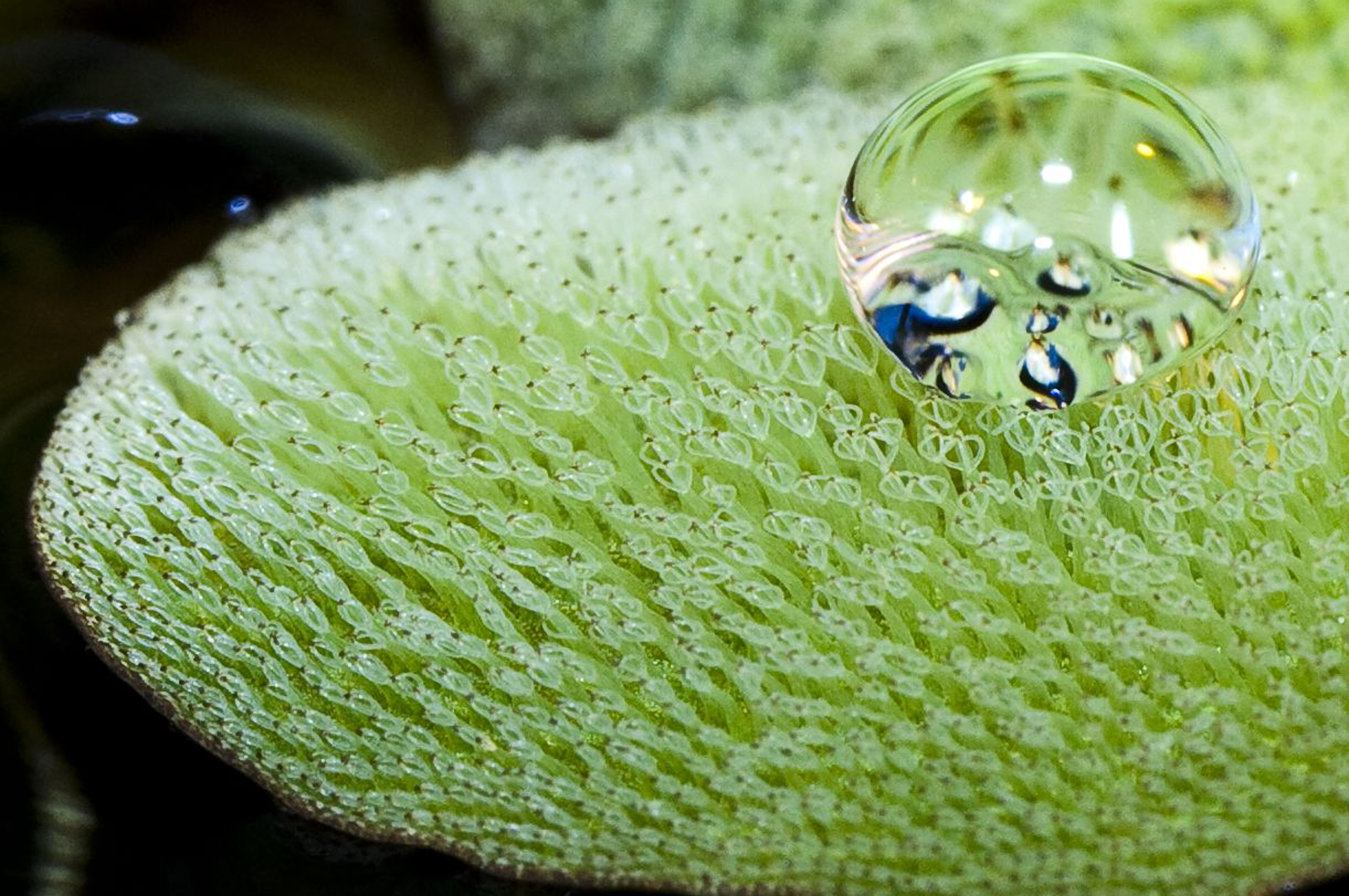
The complex hairy surface of the floating fern Salvinia, led to the discovery of the physically complex Salvinia effect related to the lotus effect. It can be technically applied for passive air lubrication in ship hull or for oil-water-separation

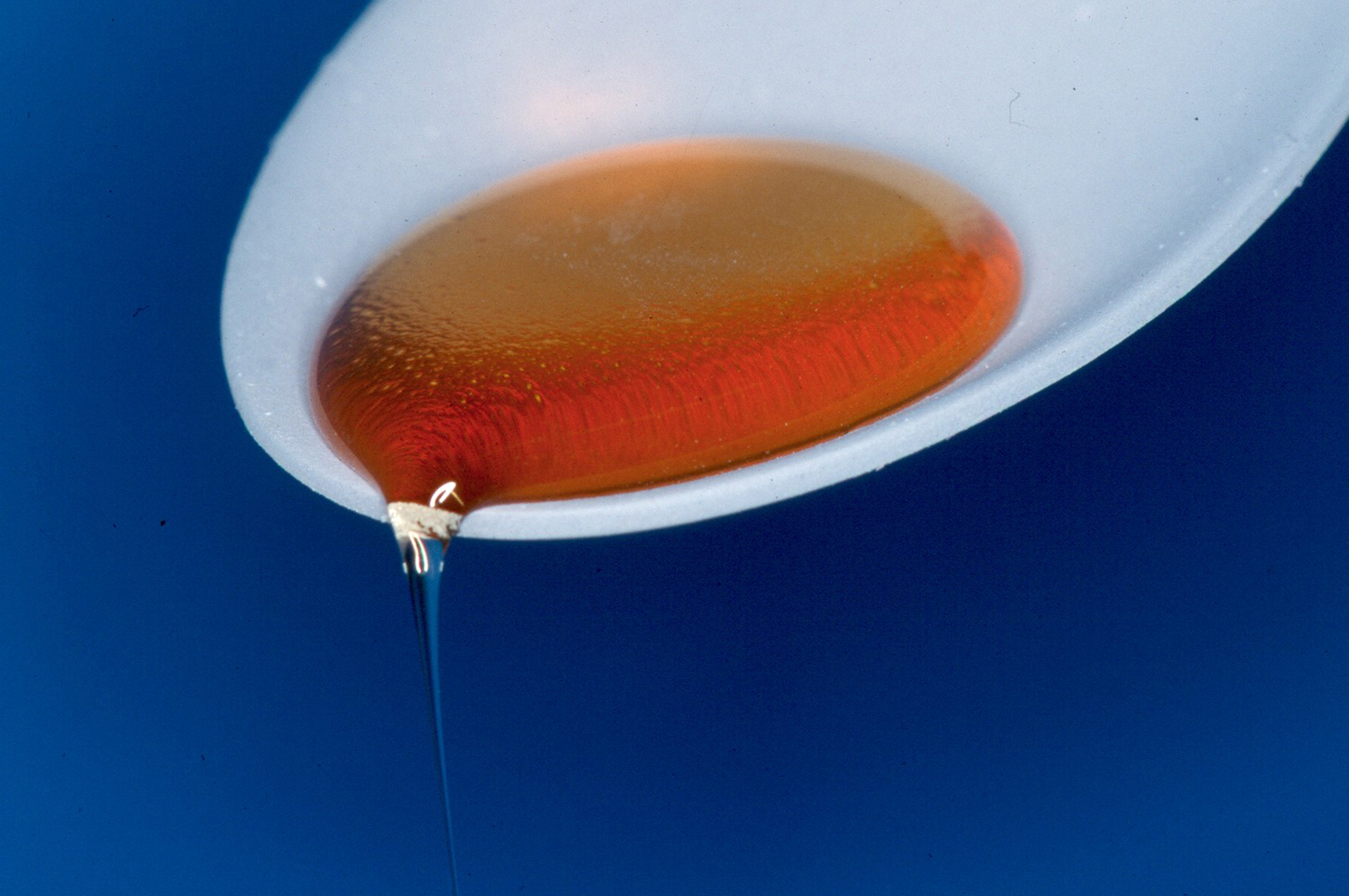
This honey-spoon, at the Bonn University in 1994, was the first technical product to demonstrate the self-cleaning effect of superhydrophobic surfaces after the discovery of the lotus-effect in 1977

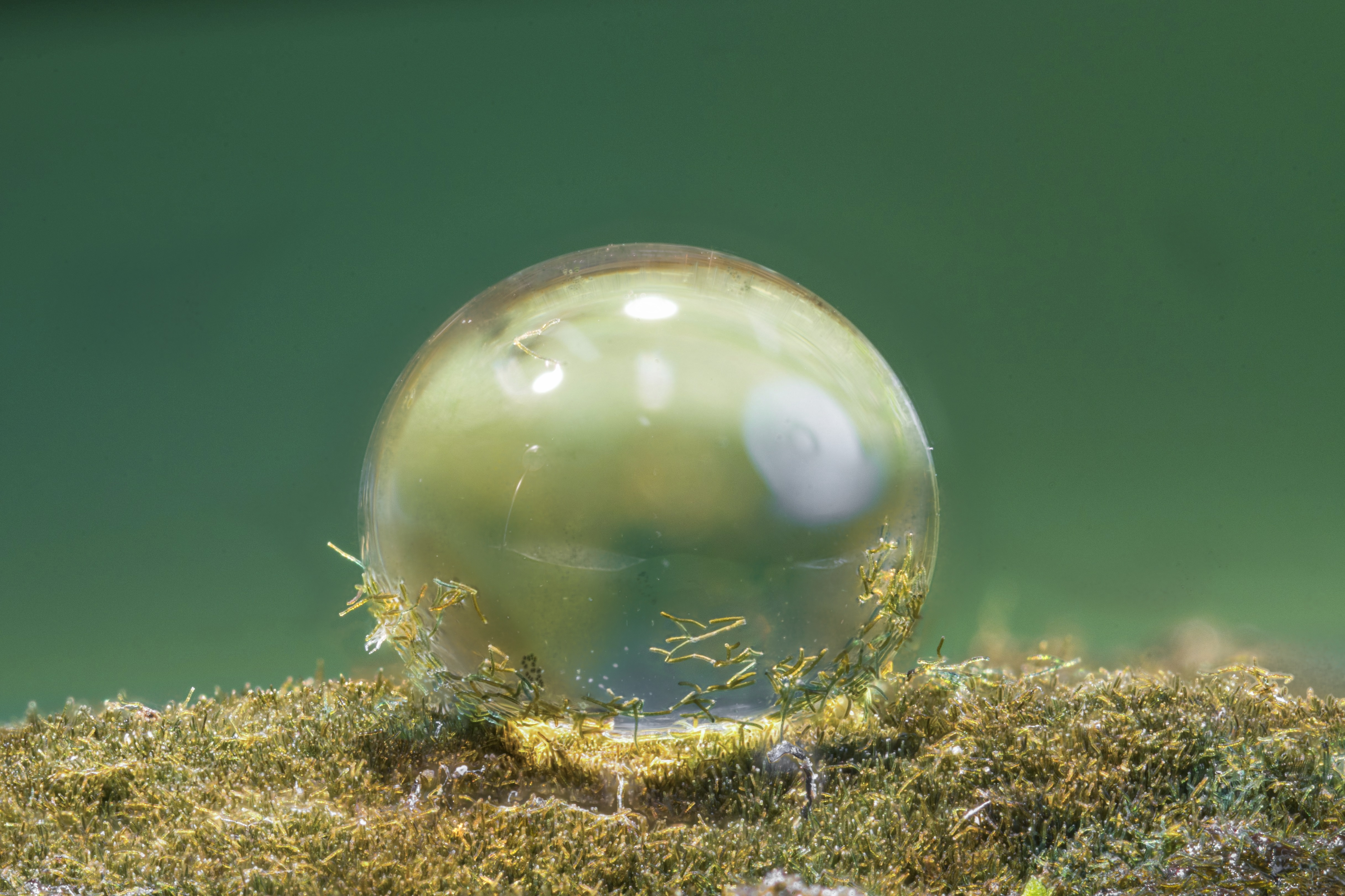
Hassallia byssoidea (biofilm and attached to the water droplet) is a terrestrial cyanobacterium forming extreme water-repellent biofilms on rocks. It uses the lotus effect for dispersal. Superhydrophobicity probably already evolved a billion years ago and may have played a crucial role in the land transition of life

== Honors and awards ==
- 1990 Member of the Academy of Science and Literature Mainz
- 1991 Foreign member of the Linnean Society of London.
- 1997 Member of the Academy of Science of North Rhine-Westphalia Düsseldorf
- 1998 Nomination for the German Future Innovation Award (Deutscher Zukunftspreis des Bundespräsidenten)
- 1998 Order of Andrès Bello of President Rafael Caldera of the Republic of Venezuela
- 1999 Member of the German National Academy of Sciences, Leopoldina
- 1999 Philip Morris Award
- 1999 German Environmental Prize (Deutscher Umweltpreis)
- 2001 GlobArt Award (Austria)
- 2002 Cactus d'Or (Monaco)
- 2010 – 2026 Director of the Board and one of the founding directors of the International Society of Bionic Engineering (ISBE).
- The shrub Barthlottia madagascariensis and several other plants are named after Wilhelm Barthlott

== Publications ==
Barthlott's publications comprise more than 480 titles, including many books. List in Google Scholar and World Library Catalogue

=== Selected works ===
- Barthlott, W. (2026): The purity of Sacred Lotus: superhydrophobic self-cleaning plant surfaces and the consequences revisited. – Planta 263, 80 Springer- doi:10.1007/s00425-026-04937-9, https://link.springer.com/article/10.1007/s00425-026-04937-9
- Barthlott, W., (2022): "Superhydrophobic terrestrial Cyanobacteria and land plant transition". Frontiers of Plant Science. doi:10.3389/fpls.2022.880439
- Barthlott, W. (2020): Plants and nature in Bible and Quran - how respect for nature connects us. - pp. 233–244 in Proceed. Conf. "Science and Actions for Species Protection: Noah's Arks for the 21st Century, May 2019, Eds. J.von Braun et al. – The Pontifical Academy of Sciences PAS, Vatican City
- Barthlott, W. (20 March 2020). "Adsorption and superficial transport of oil on biological and bionic superhydrophobic surfaces: a novel technique for oil–water separation". Philosophical Transactions of the Royal Society A: Mathematical, Physical and Engineering Sciences. 378 (2167) 20190447. Bibcode:2020RSPTA.37890447B. doi:10.1098/rsta.2019.0447. PMC 7015282. PMID 32008452.
- Mail, M.; Klein, A.; Bleckmann, H.; Schmitz, A.; Scherer, T.; Rühr, P. T; Lovric, G.; Fröhlingsdorf, R.; Gorb, S. N; Barthlott, W. (14 December 2018). "A new bioinspired method for pressure and flow sensing based on the underwater air-retaining surface of the backswimmer Notonecta". Beilstein Journal of Nanotechnology. 9: 3039–3047. doi:10.3762/bjnano.9.282. PMC 6296424. PMID 30591851.
- Busch, J.; Barthlott, W.; Brede, M.; Terlau, W.; Mail, M. (11 February 2019). "Bionics and green technology in maritime shipping: an assessment of the effect of Salvinia air-layer hull coatings for drag and fuel reduction". Philosophical Transactions of the Royal Society A: Mathematical, Physical and Engineering Sciences. 377 (2138) 20180263. Bibcode:2019RSPTA.37780263B. doi:10.1098/rsta.2018.0263. PMID 30967069. S2CID 106408059.
- Zeisler-Diehl, V. Valeska; Barthlott, W.; Schreiber, L. (2018). "Plant Cuticular Waxes: Composition, Function, and Interactions with Microorganisms". Hydrocarbons, Oils and Lipids: Diversity, Origin, Chemistry and Fate. pp. 1–16. doi:10.1007/978-3-319-54529-5_7-1. ISBN 978-3-319-54529-5. S2CID 92348167.
- Da, Sié et al. (September 2018). "Plant biodiversity patterns along a climatic gradient and across protected areas in West Africa". African Journal of Ecology. 56 (3): 641–652. Bibcode:2018AfJEc..56..641D. doi:10.1111/aje.12517
- Barthlott, W. et al (2016): Bionics and Biodiversity – Bio-inspired Technical Innovation for a Sustainable Future, in: "Biomimetic Research for Architecture and Building Construction: Biological Design and Integrative Structures" (Eds.: Knippers, J. / Nickel, K. / Speck, T.), Springer Publishers. http://www.springer.com/us/book/9783319463728
- Barthlott, W. et al. (2015): Biogeography and Biodiversity of Cacti. - Schumannia 7, pp. 1–205, ISSN 1437-2517
- Barthlott, W. et al. (2014): Orchid seed diversity: A scanning electron microscopy survey. – Englera 32, pp. 1–244.
- Yan, Y.Y.; Gao, N.; Barthlott, W. (December 2011). "Mimicking natural superhydrophobic surfaces and grasping the wetting process: A review on recent progress in preparing superhydrophobic surfaces". Advances in Colloid and Interface Science. 169 (2): 80–105. doi:10.1016/j.cis.2011.08.005. PMID 21974918.
- Sommer, Jan Henning; Kreft, Holger; Kier, Gerold; Jetz, Walter; Mutke, Jens; Barthlott, Wilhelm (7 August 2010). "Projected impacts of climate change on regional capacities for global plant species richness". Proceedings of the Royal Society B: Biological Sciences. 277 (1692): 2271–2280. doi:10.1098/rspb.2010.0120. PMC 2894901. PMID 20335215.
- Kier, G.; Kreft, H.; Lee, T. M.; Jetz, W.; Ibisch, P. L.; Nowicki, C.; Mutke, J.; Barthlott, W. (9 June 2009). "A global assessment of endemism and species richness across island and mainland regions". Proceedings of the National Academy of Sciences. 106 (23): 9322–9327. Bibcode:2009PNAS..106.9322K. doi:10.1073/pnas.0810306106. PMC 2685248. PMID 19470638.
- Barthlott, W. et al.: (July 2009). "A torch in the rain forest: thermogenesis of the Titan arum (Amorphophallus titanum)". Plant Biology. 11 (4): 499–505. Bibcode:2009PlBio..11..499B. doi:10.1111/j.1438-8677.2008.00147.x. PMID 19538388
- Barthlott, W. et al. (2007): The curious world of carnivorous plants. 244 pp., Timber Press
- Greilhuber, J.; Borsch, T.; Müller, K.; Worberg, A.; Porembski, S.; Barthlott, W. (November 2006). "Smallest Angiosperm Genomes Found in Lentibulariaceae, with Chromosomes of Bacterial Size". Plant Biology. 8 (6): 770–777. Bibcode:2006PlBio...8..770G. doi:10.1055/s-2006-924101. PMID 17203433. S2CID 260252929.
- Barthlott, W. et al. (2005): Global centres of vascular plant diversity. Nova Acta Leopoldina 92 (342): 61-83
- Borsch, T.; Hilu, K. W.; Quandt, D.; Wilde, V.; Neinhuis, C.; Barthlott, W. (July 2003). "Noncoding plastid trnT-trnF sequences reveal a well resolved phylogeny of basal angiosperms". Journal of Evolutionary Biology. 16 (4): 558–576. doi:10.1046/j.1420-9101.2003.00577.x. PMID 14632220. S2CID 12913775.
- Barthlott, W. eds. (2001). Biodiversity. doi:10.1007/978-3-662-06071-1. ISBN 978-3-642-08370-9
- Porembski, S.; Barthlott, W. (2000). Inselbergs. Ecological Studies. Vol. 146. doi:10.1007/978-3-642-59773-2. ISBN 978-3-642-64120-6. S2CID 263998814.
- Barthlott, W. Lobin, W. (Edts), Amorphophallus titanium (a monograph), 226 pp, Trop. Subtrop. Pflanzenwelt Vol. 99, Akad. Science, Mainz, F. Steiner, 1998 (PDF) Amorphophallus titanum (researchgate.net) and https://hdl.handle.net/20.500.11811/14106
- Barthlott, W.; Porembski, S.; Fischer, E.; Gemmel, B. (April 1998). "First protozoa-trapping plant found". Nature. 392 (6675): 447. Bibcode:1998Natur.392Q.447B. doi:10.1038/33037. S2CID 4415405.
- Barthlott, W. et al. (1998): Classification and terminology of plant epicuticular waxes. Bot. J. Linn. Soc. 126: 237-260
- Barthlott, W.; Neinhuis, C. (30 April 1997). "Purity of the sacred lotus, or escape from contamination in biological surfaces". Planta. 202 (1): 1–8. Bibcode:1997Plant.202....1B. doi:10.1007/s004250050096. S2CID 37872229.
- Wagner, T.; Neinhuis, C.; Barthlott, W. (July 1996). "Wettability and Contaminability of Insect Wings as a Function of Their Surface Sculptures". Acta Zoologica. 77 (3): 213–225. doi:10.1111/j.1463-6395.1996.tb01265.x. S2CID 84502320.
- Burr, B. et al. (1995): Untersuchungen zur Ultraviolettreflexion von Angiospermenblüten. III. Dilleniidae und Asteridae. 186 pp, Akad. Wiss. Lit. Mainz. F. Steiner Verlag, Stuttgart. (PDF) (researchgate.net)
- Noga, G; Wolter, M.; Barthlott, W.; Petry, W. (1991). "Quantitative evaluation of epicuticular wax alterations as induced by surfactant treatment". Quantitative Evaluation of Epicuticular Wax Alterations as Induced by Surfactant Treatment. 65 (3–4): 239–252. INIST 5594526.
- Barthlott, W. (1979): Cacti. 249 S., Stanley Thornes Publishers, London.
- Barthlott, W., Ehler, N. (1977): Raster-Elektronenmikroskopie der Epidermis-Oberflächen von Spermatophyten. 105 pp ., Akad. Wiss. Lit. Mainz. F. Steiner Verlag, Stuttgart. http://lotus-salvinia.de/pdf/024.%20Barthlott_Ehler%201977%20Epidermisoberflaechen%20Spermatophyten.pdf or (PDF) (researchgate.net)
