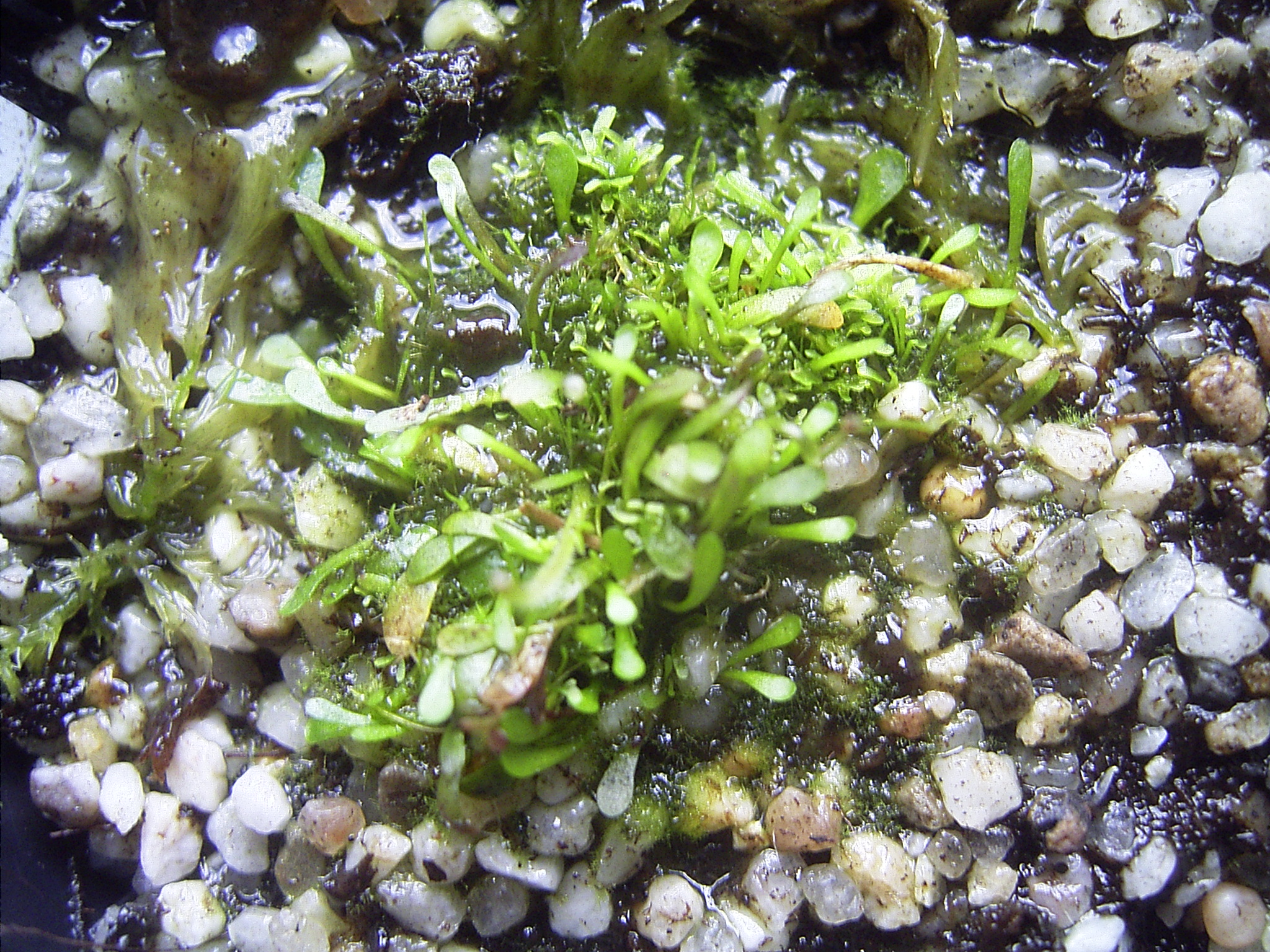

Scientific classification
- Kingdom: Plantae
- Clade: Tracheophytes
- Clade: Angiosperms
- Clade: Eudicots
- Clade: Asterids
- Order: Lamiales
- Family: Lentibulariaceae
- Genus: Genlisea
- Subgenus: Genlisea subg. Genlisea
- Species: G. pygmaea

Binomial name
- Genlisea pygmaea A.St.-Hil. (1833)

Synonyms
- Genlisea esmeraldae Steyerm. (1953)

= Genlisea pygmaea =

Species of carnivorous plant

Genlisea pygmaea is a corkscrew plant native to South America.
