= Genlisea africana =

Scientific classification
- Kingdom: Plantae
- Clade: Tracheophytes
- Clade: Angiosperms
- Clade: Eudicots
- Clade: Asterids
- Order: Lamiales
- Family: Lentibulariaceae
- Genus: Genlisea
- Subgenus: Genlisea subg. Genlisea
- Species: G. africana

Binomial name
- Genlisea africana Oliv.

Species of carnivorous plant

Genlisea africana is a species of carnivorous plant in the genus Genlisea. It is native to Zimbabwe. The species was first described by the botanist Daniel Oliver in 1865.
