= Etiolation =

Developmental pathway followed in flowering plants in absence of visible light

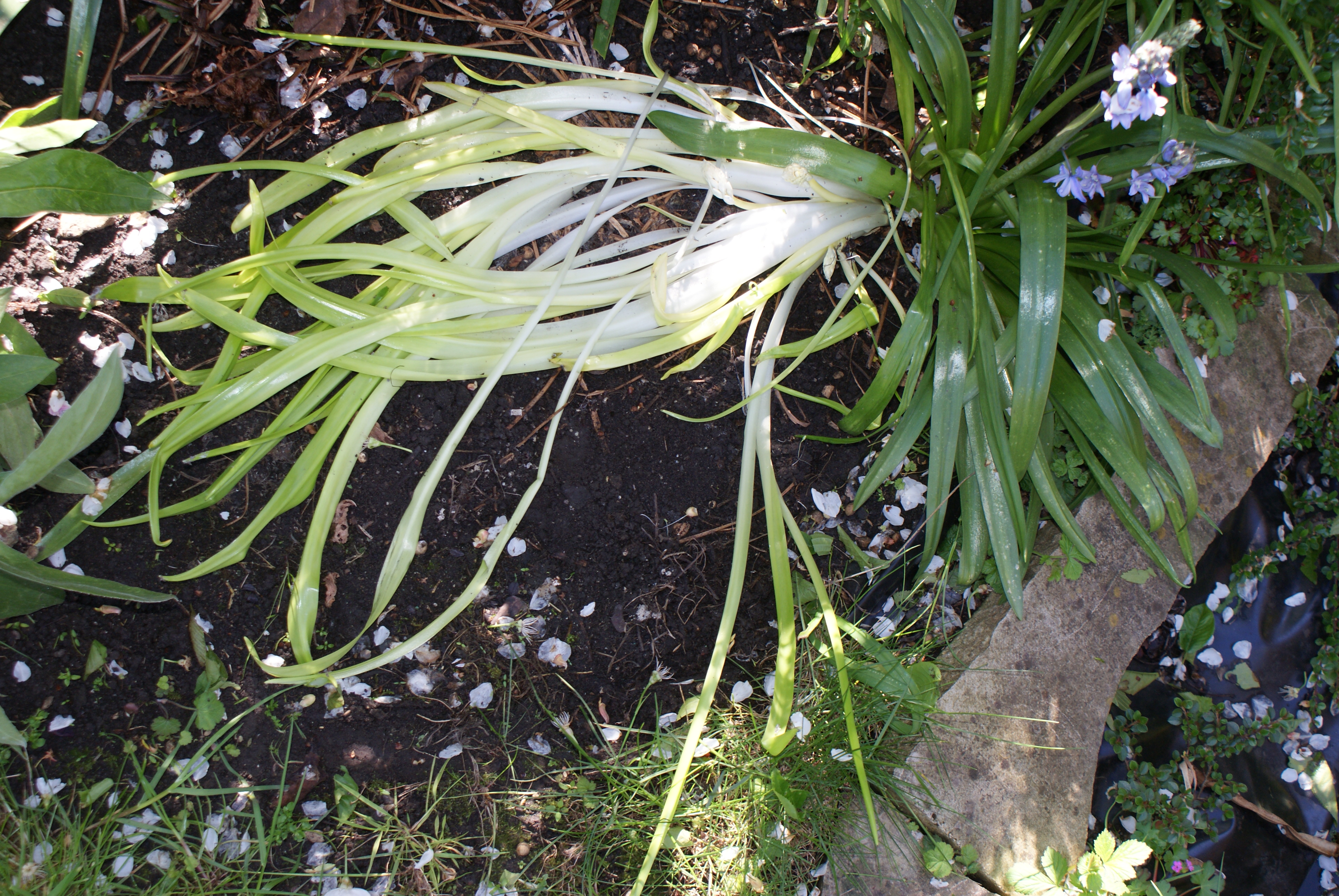
Spanish bluebells Hyacinthoides hispanica, showing both leaves and flowers in both etiolated and non-etiolated states. The longest etiolated leaves are about 50 cm long.

In botany, etiolation /iːtiəˈleɪʃən/ is a characteristic of flowering plants (angiosperms) grown in partial or complete absence of light. It is characterized by long, weak stems; smaller leaves due to longer internodes; and a pale yellow color (chlorosis). The development of seedlings in the dark ("skotomorphogenesis") leads to etiolated seedlings.

== Effects ==
Etiolation increases the likelihood that a plant will reach a light source, often from under the soil, leaf litter, or shade from competing plants. The growing tips are strongly attracted to light and will elongate towards it. The pale color results from a lack of chlorophyll.

Some of the changes that occur include

1. elongation of stems and leaves;
2. weakening of cell walls in stems and leaves;
3. longer internodes, hence fewer leaves per unit length of stem;
4. chlorosis, a pale yellowish-white coloration.

De-etiolation is the transition of seedlings from below-ground growth to above-ground growth form.

== Causes ==
Etiolation is controlled by the plant hormones called auxins, which are produced by the growing tip to maintain apical dominance. Auxin diffuses, and is transported, downwards from the tip, with effects including suppressing growth of lateral buds. Auxins are active in light; when they are active they stimulate proton pumps in the cell wall which increases the acidity of the cell wall and activates expansin (an enzyme that breaks bonds in the cell wall structure) that weaken the cell wall and allow the cell to expand.

Chloroplasts that have not been exposed to light are called etioplasts (see also plastids).

== De-etiolation ==
De-etiolation is a series of physiological and biochemical changes a plant shoot undergoes when emerging from the ground or in response to light after a period of insufficient light exposure. This process is known informally as greening. These changes that are triggered in the plant's shoots or already formed leaves and stems occur in preparation for photosynthesis.

Some of the changes that occur include

1. Inhibition of hypocotyl lengthening.
2. Stimulation of cotyledon expansion.
3. Opening of the apical hook, see Seedling's photomorphogenesis and etiolation for details.
4. Stimulation of synthesis of anthocyanins.
5. Stimulation of chloroplasts development from etioplasts.

This process is regulated by the exposure of various photoreceptor pigments to light. Phytochrome A and phytochrome B both respond to an increasing proportion of red light to far-red light which occurs when the shoot comes out into the open. Cryptochrome 1 responds to increasing amounts of blue light when the shoot reaches the surface.

== See also ==
- Blanching (horticulture) – a technique for growing vegetables that induces etiolation to produce more delicate vegetables
