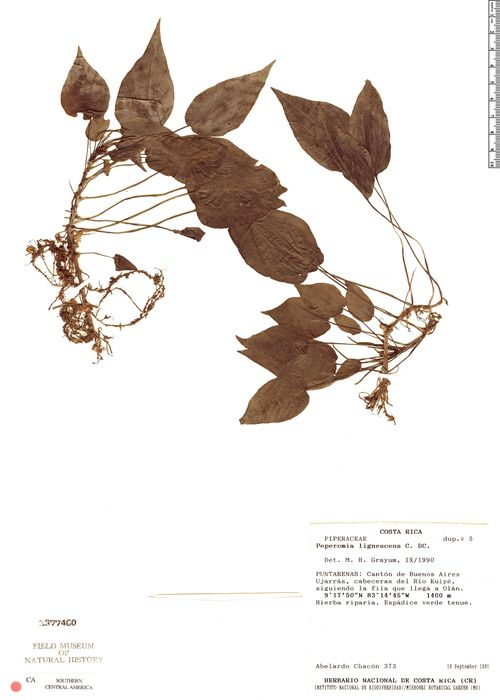

Scientific classification
- Kingdom: Plantae
- Clade: Tracheophytes
- Clade: Angiosperms
- Clade: Magnoliids
- Order: Piperales
- Family: Piperaceae
- Genus: Peperomia
- Species: P. tenuifolia

Binomial name
- Peperomia tenuifolia C.DC.

Synonyms
- Peperomia aguacatensis (C.DC.; Peperomia hymenodes Trel.; Peperomia killipii Trel.; Peperomia nicoyana C.DC.; Peperomia philipsonii var. panamensis Yunck.

= Peperomia tenuifolia =

Species of flowering plant

Peperomia tenuifolia is a species of epiphyte or lithophyte in the genus Peperomia found in Colombia, Costa Rica, and Panama. It primarily grows on wet tropical biomes. Its conservation status is Not Threatened.

== Description ==
The first specimens where collected in Costa Rica.

Peperomia tenuifolia has a long petiolate that is inferiorly elliptic-oblong, acuminate at the apex, acute at the base, or cordulate superiorly ovate-lanceolate. It has a thin membranous pellucid punctulate achenes on both sides, slightly adpressed hairy subfiliformly eoliolate. It is a 9-nerved nervules that are oblong at the margin, terminal axillary and filiform catkins, deeply floriferous, with long pedunculate limbs, peduncles shorter than petioles, and rhachi subtly glandulose-pubescent. Ovary rhachi has bracts elliptically rounded at the middle and subsessile.

The stem of the herb is leathery and glabrous from radiating nodes. The limbs are 0.065 long and 0.028 wide. The peduncles are around 0.04 long. and petioles are 0.08 long. The catkins are 0.001 thick.

== Taxonomy and naming ==
It was described in 1872 by Casimir de Candolle in Linnaea 37: 371. 1871-1873, from specimens collected by Oersted.

== Distribution and habitat ==
It is found in Colombia, Costa Rica, and Panama. It grows on epiphyte or lithophyte environment and is a herb. It grows on wet tropical biomes.

== Conservation ==
This species is assessed as Not Threatened, in a preliminary report.
