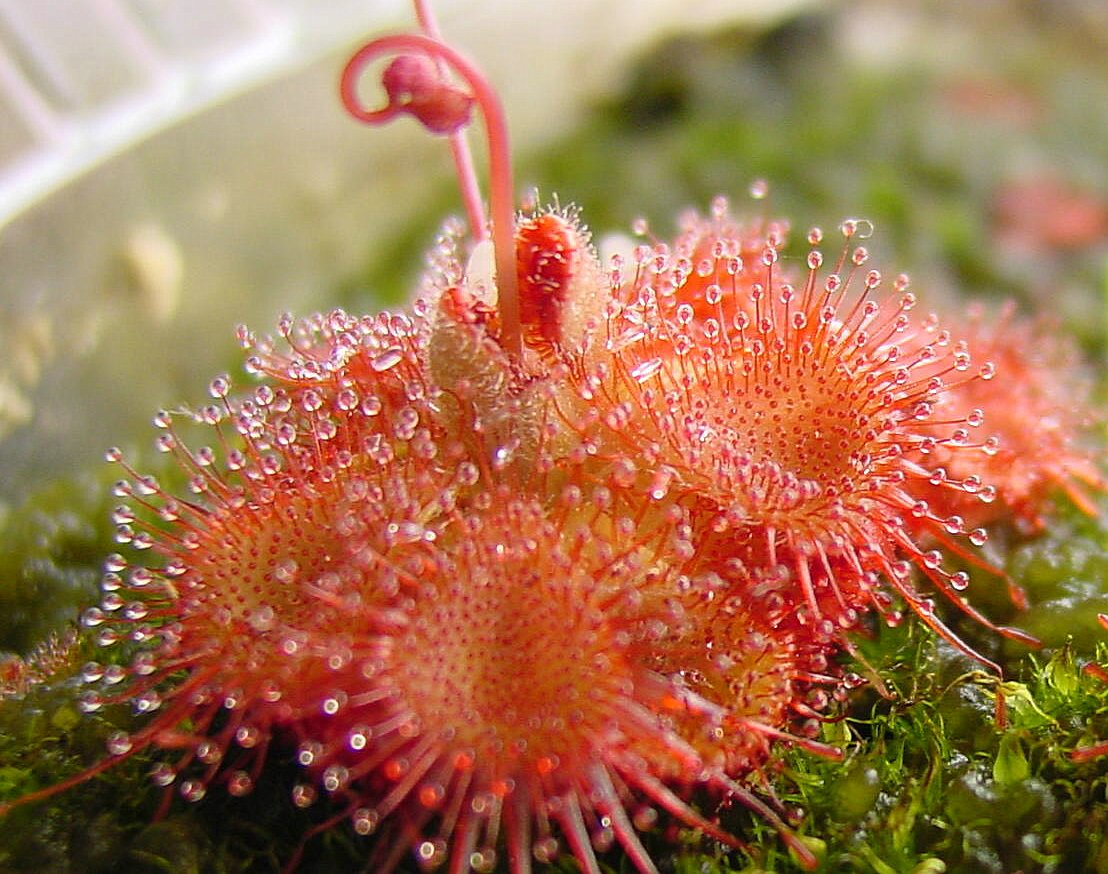
- D. sessilifolia grown in cultivation

Scientific classification
- Kingdom: Plantae
- Clade: Tracheophytes
- Clade: Angiosperms
- Clade: Eudicots
- Order: Caryophyllales
- Family: Droseraceae
- Genus: Drosera
- Subgenus: Drosera subg. Drosera
- Section: Drosera sect. Thelocalyx
- Species: D. sessilifolia

Binomial name
- Drosera sessilifolia A.St.-Hil.

Synonyms
- D. dentata Benth.

= Drosera sessilifolia =

Species of carnivorous plant

Drosera sessilifolia is a species in the carnivorous plant genus Drosera that is native to Brazil, Guyana, and Venezuela and grows in sandy or gravelly soils in seasonal seepages where a thin film of water collects. It produces a rosette of small, wedge-shaped to round carnivorous leaves that are usually yellowish but become redder with age. Inflorescences produce pink-lilac flowers. It has a diploid chromosome number of 2n = 20.

== Botanical history ==
Drosera sessilifolia was first described by Augustin Saint-Hilaire in 1824 after it was discovered in the western end of the Brazilian state Minas Gerais near the São Francisco River. George Bentham then described D. dentata from Guyana, which Ludwig Diels reduced to synonymy with D. sessilifolia in his 1906 monograph on the Droseraceae. It is closely related to D. burmanni, the only other species in section Thelocalyx, though D. burmanni is native to Australia and Southeast Asia.

== See also ==
- List of Drosera species
