= Drosera katangensis =

Conservation status
- Critically Endangered (IUCN 3.1)

Scientific classification
- Kingdom: Plantae
- Clade: Tracheophytes
- Clade: Angiosperms
- Clade: Eudicots
- Order: Caryophyllales
- Family: Droseraceae
- Genus: Drosera
- Species: D. katangensis

Binomial name
- Drosera katangensis Taton

Species of carnivorous plant

Drosera katangensis is a plant species endemic to Haut-Katanga, Democratic Republic of Congo. D. katangensis is a perennial helophyte, growing in grassy swamps. It is known from a single collection in 1912, and has not been identified since. It is threatened by logging, mining concessions, agriculture, and has been assessed as CR by the IUCN under criteria B2ab(iii).
