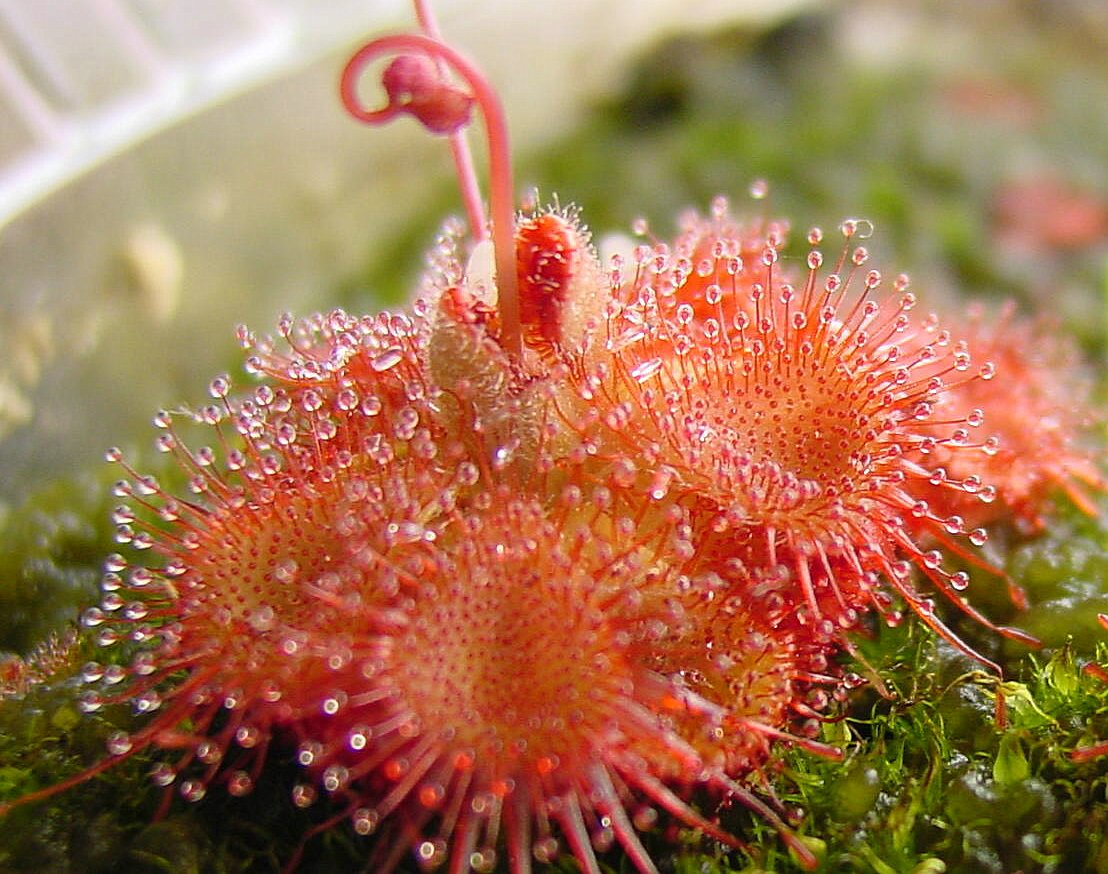
- Drosera sessilifolia

Scientific classification
- Kingdom: Plantae
- Clade: Tracheophytes
- Clade: Angiosperms
- Clade: Eudicots
- Order: Caryophyllales
- Family: Droseraceae
- Genus: Drosera
- Subgenus: Drosera subg. Drosera
- Section: Drosera sect. Thelocalyx; Planch.

Type species
- D. burmanni Vahl

Species
- Drosera burmanni; Drosera sessilifolia

Synonyms
- D. subg. Thelocalyx (Planch.) Drude

= Drosera sect. Thelocalyx =

Section of carnivorous plants within Drosera subg. Drosera

Drosera sect. Thelocalyx is a section of two species in the subgenus Drosera of genus Drosera.

== Description and distribution ==
Both species appear to be very similar and are often confused in cultivation; both have small leaves arranged in a rosette and are annual plants. Their distributions do not overlap.

Image	Scientific name	Distribution
	D. burmanni Vahl	Southeast Asia and Australia
	D. sessilifolia A.St.-Hil.	Brazil, Guyana, and Venezuela

== Taxonomy ==
Section Thelocalyx was first described by Jules Émile Planchon in 1848 and was later moved to the rank of subgenus in 1891 by Carl Georg Oscar Drude. It was later moved back to sectional rank by Rüdiger Seine and Wilhelm Barthlott in 1994. In 1996, Jan Schlauer revised the infrageneric taxonomy and supported the subgeneric rank, citing the pentamerous gynoecium and suggesting that the two species are relatively primitive with respect to other species in the genus. However, molecular phylogenetic analysis by Rivadavia, Kondo, Kato and Mitsuyasu in 2003 supported returning it to section rank within subgenus Drosera.

== See also ==
- List of Drosera species
