= Wall stress relaxation =

The plant cell wall is made up of hydrated polymetric material, allowing it to have viscoelastic properties. The primary cell wall of a plant consists of cellulose fibers, hemicellulose, and xyloglucans. This load bearing network is also surrounded by pectins and glycoproteins.

Wall stress relaxation is an important factor in cell wall expansion. Wall stress (measured in force per unit area) is created in response to the plant cell's turgor pressure. Turgor pressure creates tension in the cell walls of plants, fungi, and bacteria, as it opposes the pressure of the cell's primary cell wall; this also allows for stretching of the cell wall. The stretching of the cell wall, or the reduction of stress, occurs as a result of cell expansion and rearrangement. Cell expansion is crucial for the reshaping and rearranging of plant cells. Expansion is the result of "creep", or selective wall loosening, which is driven by turgor pressure. During this "creep", cellulose microfibers move relative to each other creating an irreversible extension

== Cell expansion ==
Cell expansion begins with the selective loosening of the cell wall, reducing the plant cell's turgor pressure and water potential. This allows for the influx of water, leading to cell enlargement. This enlargement is made possible by the sliding of polymers, increasing the cell wall's surface area.

In most plants, cell expansion is anisotropic. Previous experiments have confirmed that the cellulose microfibril orientation in the primary cell wall is the key for determining the direction of anisotropic growth and expansion. Cells tend to grow transversely to the cellulose microfibril orientation.

It has been found that cell walls expand faster under acidic conditions. This is called acid growth. Treating living cells with acid induces acidification of the cell wall by activating an ATPase in the cell wall's plasma membrane. In onion epidermal cells, which are used as models to study anisotropy in extension, extension is pH dependent in both directions (transverse and parallel to cellulose orientation). Extension is also nearly three times higher at a pH of 4-5 than a pH of 6. This is a strong indication of acid growth in these cell wall samples. It has also been shown that the activity of expansins, a cell-wall loosening protein, is maximized at low pH conditions (around a pH of 4).

Heat inactivation reduces extension transverse to cellulose microfibril orientation but does not reduce parallel extension. This indicates that heat inactivation has a directional effect on cell wall extension. In the transverse direction, extension depends on proteins, as denatured proteins cause reduced extension. In addition, extension occurs parallel to cellulose microfibril orientation is dependent on pH. Therefore, acid induced extension in the parallel direction is not protein mediated as the proteins are denatured and extension parallel to cellulose microfibril orientation is not affected.

== Expansins ==
Expansins are a class of proteins that act as wall-loosening agents. These proteins break hydrogen bonds between xyloglucans and cellulose as well as restore acid growth of heat-inactivated cell walls by stimulating growth. To date, three classes of expansins have been identified: α-expansins, β-expansins, and bacterial expansins. There are still numerous unanswered questions regarding expansins and their exact mechanism.

Experiments done with mechanical stress assays have shown that α-expansins do not weaken the cell wall, yet they have been shown to induce "creep" in cell walls. Additionally, α-expansins have been found to mediate acid-induced wall extension. Opposed to α-expansins, β-expansins drastically reduce the tensile strength of cell walls. Not only do β-expansins cause "creep" but it also solubilizes polysaccharides in the middle lamella, aiding the penetration of the pollen tube to the plant's ovary. β-expansins have been studied in grass pollen due to the fact that β-expansins are difficult to extract in active form from plants outside the pollen group. Expansins have even been as plant pathogenic bacteria, identified by phylogenetic analysis. Gene knockout experiments were used in discovering that bacterial expansins facilitate the colonization of plant tissue.

== Xyloglucan endotransglucosylase/endohydrolases (XTHs) ==
Xyloglucan endotransglucosylase/endohydrolases (XTHs) are another class of enzymes that play a role in cell wall loosening. Most XTHs break and put back together xyloglucans that restrict the movement of adjacent cellulose microfibrils in the cell wall. This is referred to as xyloglucan endotransglucosylase action (XET action). XET action allows for xyloglucan restructuring which therefore allows cellulose microfibrils to move apart while still maintaining the mechanical strength of the cell wall, preventing lysis. Other XTHs use and bind to water which is referred to as xyloglucan hydrolase action (XEH action).

These XTH enzymes need to diffuse into the cell wall and form complexes with, or act on, xyloglucans in the non-load bearing outer region of the cell wall. After a lag period, the enzymes will reach a concentration threshold in the load-bearing region of the cell wall and the activity of the enzyme will then be apparent.

A specific XTH, SkXTH1 is able to perform XET activity over a large range of pHs and temperatures. Heat inactivation reduces the cell wall extension but if SkXTH1 is added, about 66% of the protein-dependent creep activity that was eliminated during heat inactivation can thus be restored. However, this restoration of extension occurred only in the transverse to the cellulose microfibril orientation. This indicates that SkXTH1 is an XTH enzyme responsible for catalyzing the movement of adjacent cellulose microfibrils relative to one another transverse to their net cellulose orientation. This further supports that extension in this transverse direction is protein dependent, whereas in the parallel direction, it is not.
