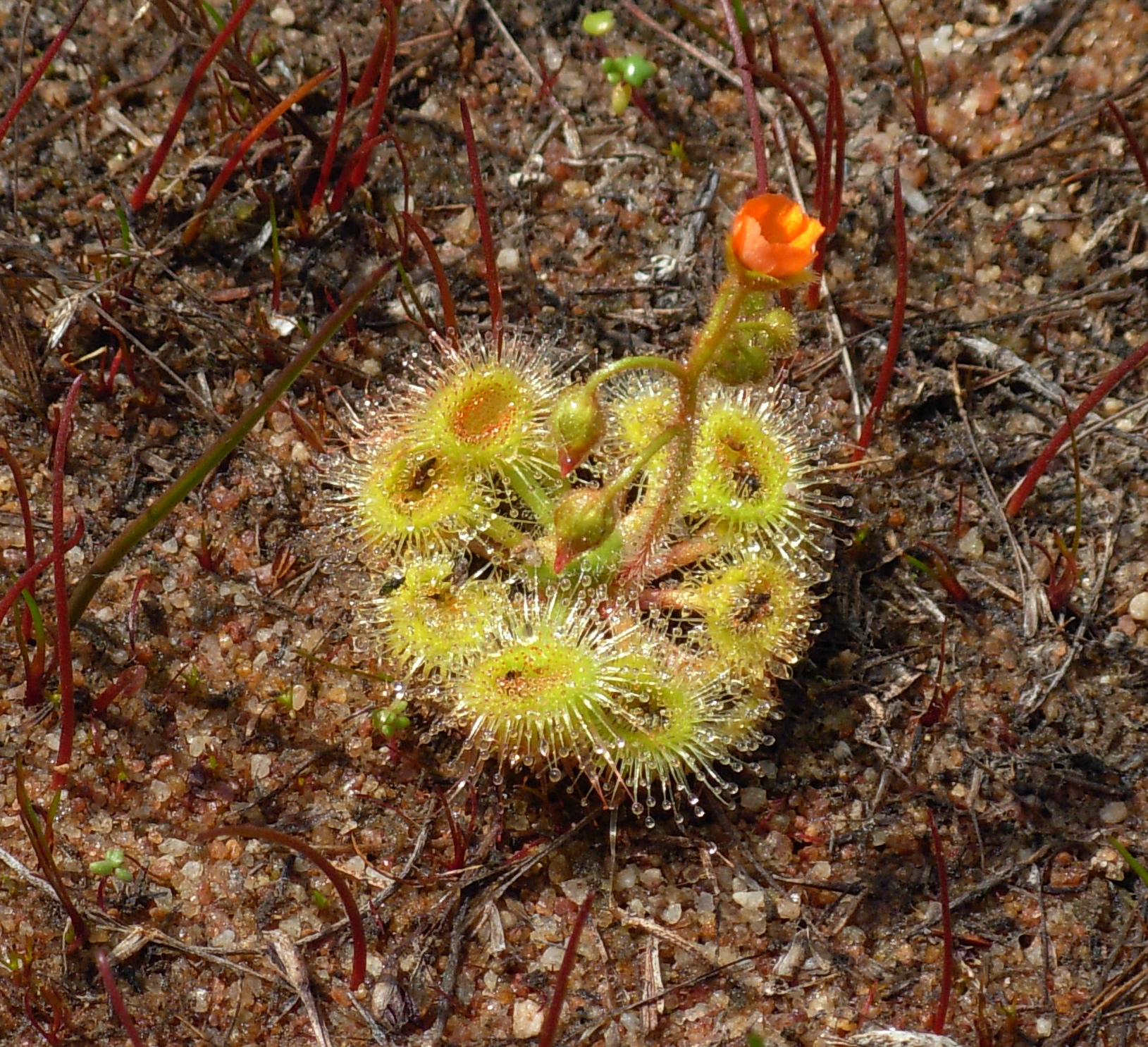
- D. glanduligera with flower

Conservation status
- Least Concern (IUCN 3.1)

Scientific classification
- Kingdom: Plantae
- Clade: Tracheophytes
- Clade: Angiosperms
- Clade: Eudicots
- Order: Caryophyllales
- Family: Droseraceae
- Genus: Drosera
- Subgenus: Drosera subg. Ergaleium
- Section: Drosera sect. Coelophylla
- Species: D. glanduligera

Binomial name
- Drosera glanduligera Lehm.

Synonyms
- D. anagallidiflora F.Muell. ex Diels; D. patellifera Planch.

= Drosera glanduligera =

Species of carnivorous plant

Drosera glanduligera, commonly known as the pimpernel sundew or scarlet sundew, is a species of carnivorous plant in the Sundew family, Droseraceae. It is endemic to southern Australia. It is an ephemeral annual plant that grows in the winter and flowers from August to November.

== Distribution and habitat ==
Drosera glanduligera is a widespread species, occurring in southern Queensland, New South Wales, South Australia, Tasmania (including Flinders Island), Victoria, and Western Australia. It can be found growing in a wide range of habitats and soil conditions across its range, and may be locally abundant in some areas.

== Description ==
Drosera glanduligera is a small herbaceous plant with 15 to 20 concave spathulate leaves, each only 8–20 mm (0.31–0.79 in) long, arranged in a convex to nearly flat rosette. When flowering it produces an erect glandular-hirsute stem up to 10 mm (0.39 in) tall bearing several orange flowers. Lacking a tuber, its roots are fibrous.

Each leaf is covered with touch-sensitive glandular tentacles, with sticky glue-tentacles at the centre of the leaf and non-sticky snap-tentacles arranged around the leaf margins. The trapping mechanism of this species is unique in that it combines features of both flypaper and snap traps. When triggered, the outer snap-tentacles catapult prey onto the sticky glue-tentacles at the centre of the leaf, which slowly draw the prey into the concave depression of the leaf over a span of approximately 2 minutes, after which digestion commences. Once a snap-tentacle has snapped, this movement is not repeatable.

Footage of prey trapping mechanism
D. glanduligera capturing fruit flies

Timelapse of D. glanduligera trapping mechanism

Slow motion video showing bending of a single snap-tentacle

== History and taxonomy ==
Drosera glanduligera was first described by Johann Georg Christian Lehmann in 1844. In 1848 Jules Émile Planchon split the genus Drosera into several sections, with D. glanduligera as the sole member of section Coelophylla, and in 1906 Ludwig Diels included sect. Coelophylla in the newly created subgenus Drosera subg. Rorella. In 1994, Rüdiger Seine and Wilhelm Barthlott proposed that subg. Rorella be merged with Drosera subg. Drosera. In 1996, Jan Schlauer argued that the primitive pollen type of D. glanduligera precludes it from being included under subg. Drosera and proposed elevating Coelophylla to subgenus in 1996, however, this classification would not last. A 2003 paper that conducted phylogenetic analyses of chloroplast and ribosomal DNA sequences of 59 species of Drosera retained Coelophylla as a section under subg. Drosera, while a 2017 chemotaxonomic analysis of phytochemicals in the leaves of various Australian Drosera species by Schlauer et al. regarded D. gladuligera as belonging to sect. Coelophylla in Drosera subgen. Ergaleium.

== Cultivation ==
Drosera glanduligera can be a difficult plant to cultivate. Germination requires cool temperatures of approximately 1–8 °C (34–46 °F) at night and warmer temperatures of 15–25 °C (59–77 °F) during the day. Scarification may also assist in germination. Plants must be kept well fed to ensure strong growth and blooming, with either natural prey or diluted foliar fertiliser.
