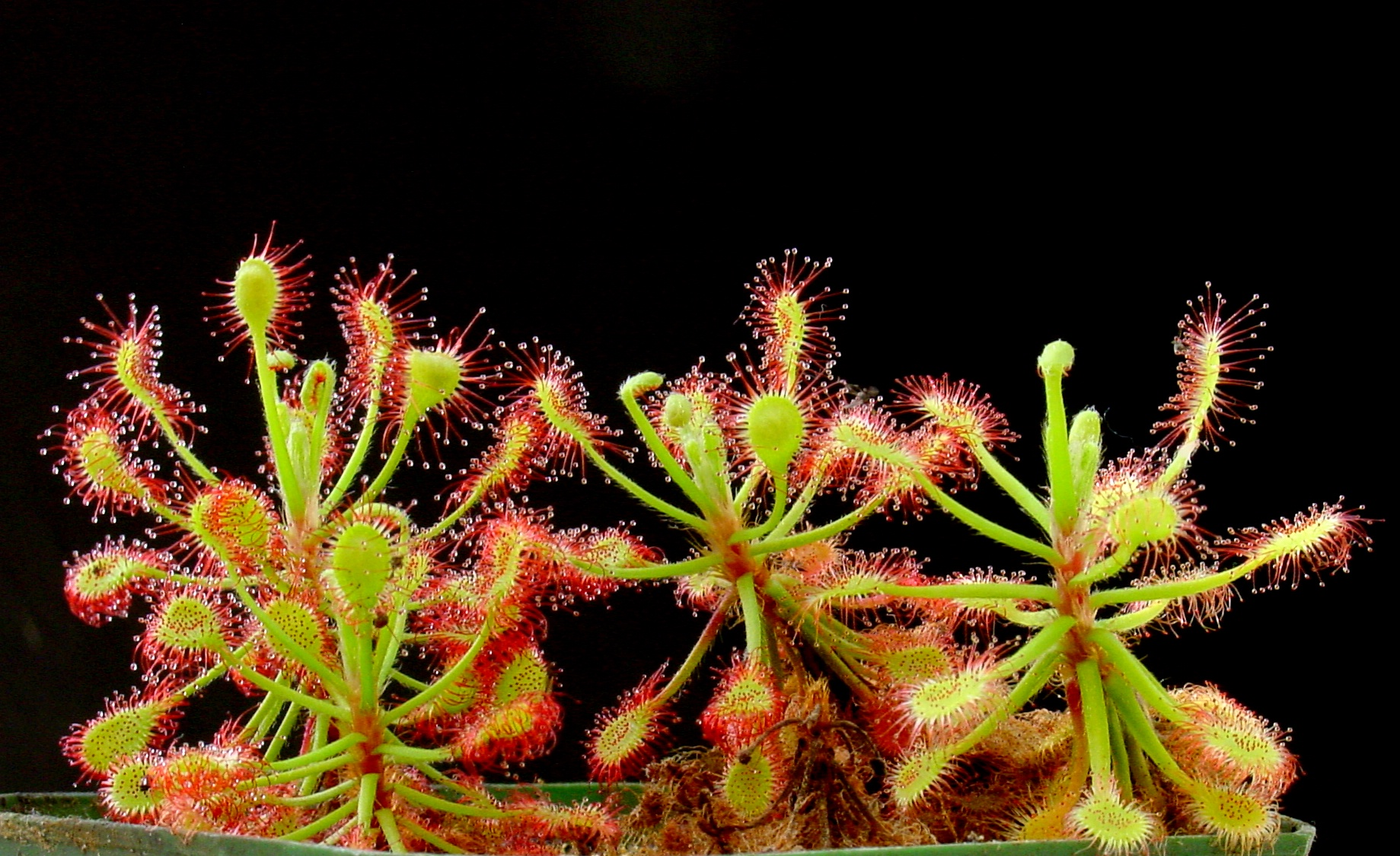

Scientific classification
- Kingdom: Plantae
- Clade: Tracheophytes
- Clade: Angiosperms
- Clade: Eudicots
- Order: Caryophyllales
- Family: Droseraceae
- Genus: Drosera
- Subgenus: Drosera subg. Drosera
- Section: Drosera sect. Drosera
- Species: D. madagascariensis

Binomial name
- Drosera madagascariensis DC.

= Drosera madagascariensis =

Species of carnivorous plant

Drosera madagascariensis is a carnivorous plant of the sundew genus (Drosera). It was described in 1824 by A. P. de Candolle and is native to Africa.

== Description ==
Drosera madagascariensis is a robust stem-forming species with a clearly visible stem, which stands upright in the case of younger plants and either uses its leaves to anchor itself to surrounding vegetation as it matures or bends over and forms a scrambling stem.

=== Leaves ===
The plant grows to a height of 25 cm (10 in). The upper part of the plant is composed of carnivorous leaves while the lower part of the stem is covered with the dried remains of older leaves. The leaf arrangement on the stem is alternate. The petioles are 1.5–3 cm long and support 10–15 mm long and 7 mm wide obtuse to spatulate laminae. The root system is relatively undeveloped, serving mainly as an anchor and for water absorption, since nutrient uptake is achieved through carnivory.

=== Flowers and fruit ===
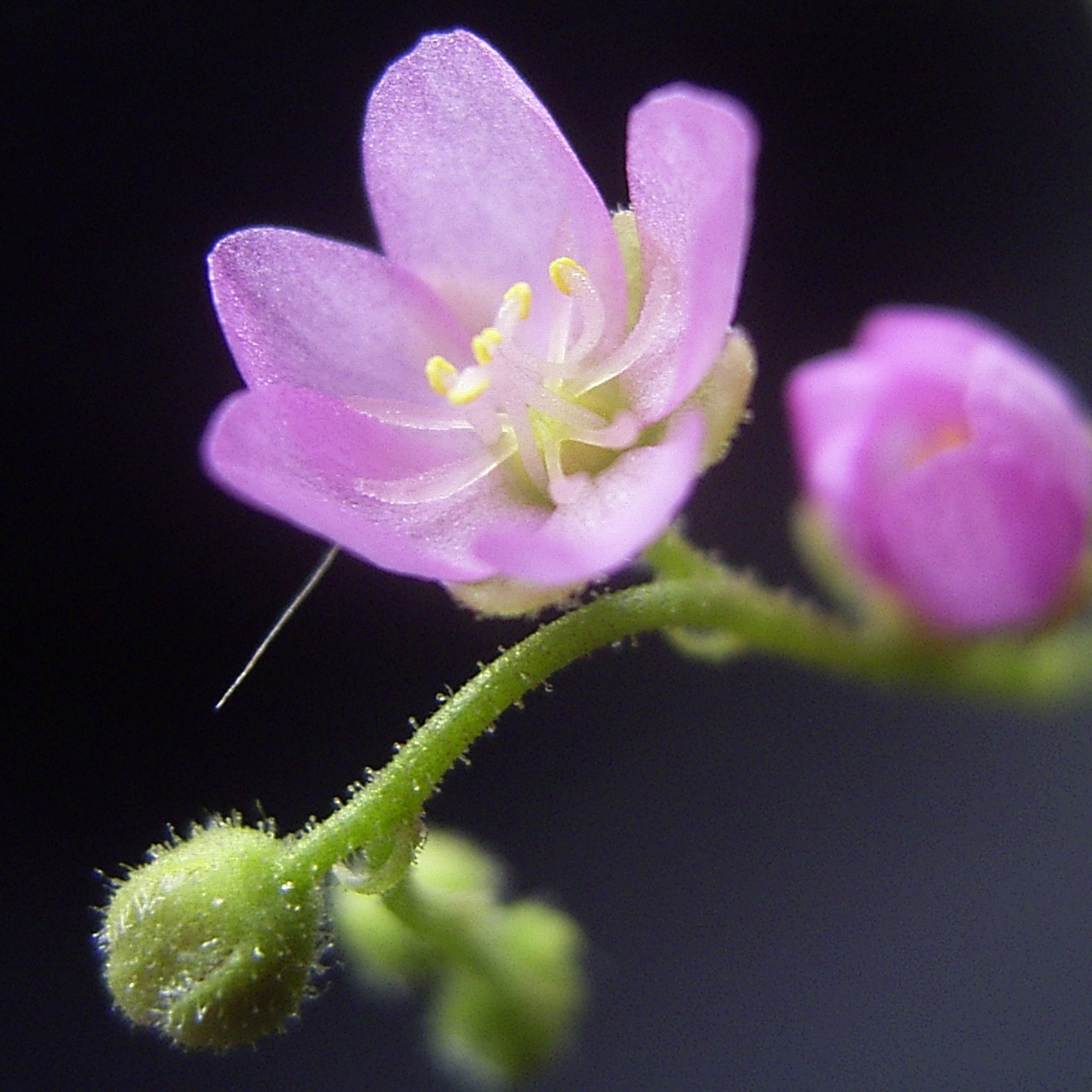
Drosera madagascariensis flower

Drosera madagascariensis forms one or two slightly pubescent inflorescences which are 20–40 cm (8–15.5 in) tall and bear 4-12 flowers on 2–5 mm long peduncles. The sepals are ovate and slightly pubescent. The pink petals are obovate, 6–12 mm (0.24–0.47 in) long and 4–6 mm wide. The seed capsules are dehiscent and bear numerous seeds up to 0.6 mm long.

== Distribution ==
Drosera madagascariensis is native to the tropical Africa (Guinea, Nigeria, Cameroon, Congo, Angola, Zambesi, Tanganyika) as far south as South Africa and east to the island of Madagascar. It is found in swamps and sphagnum bogs.
