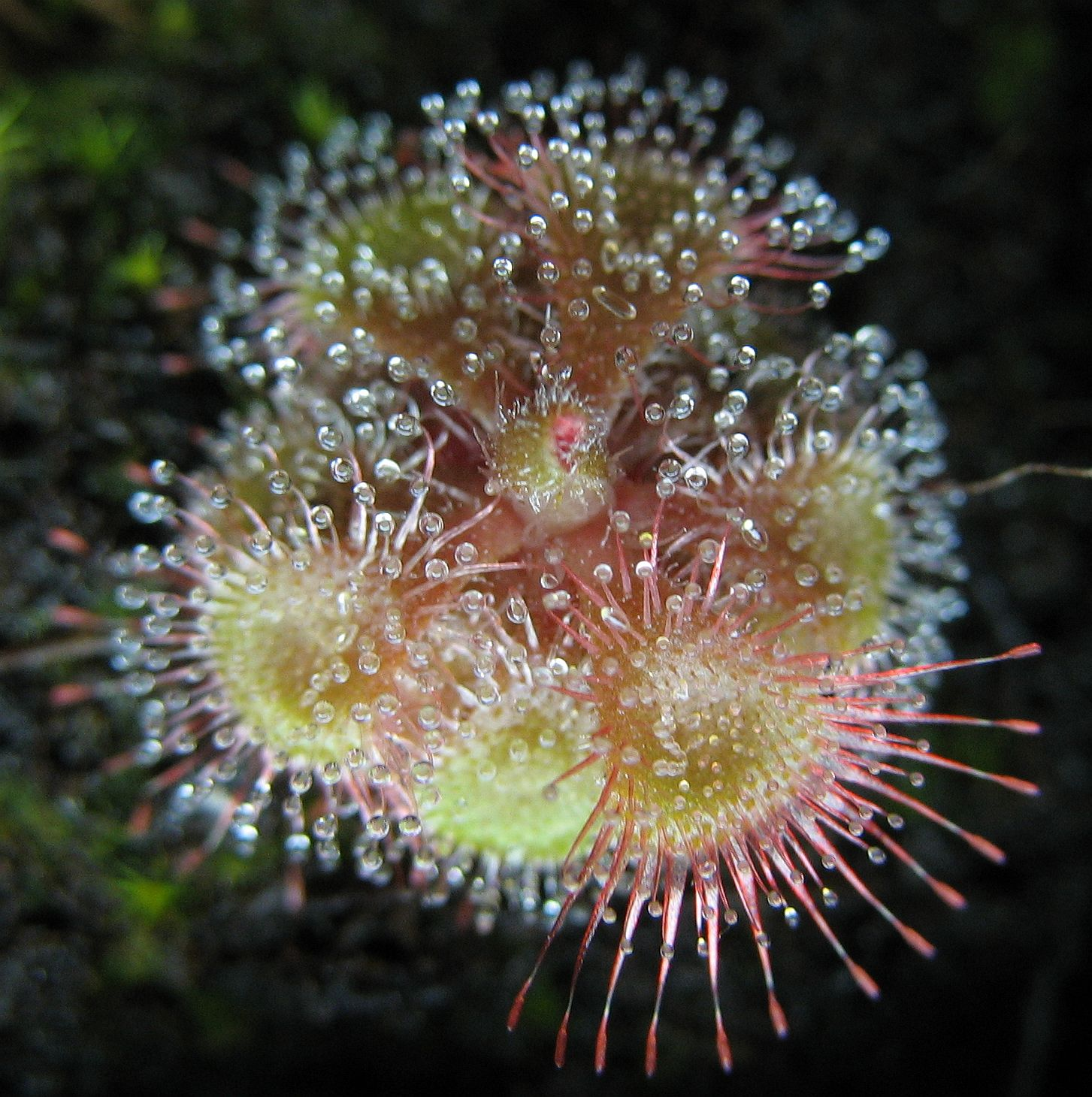
- Drosera burmanni

Conservation status
- Least Concern (IUCN 3.1)

Scientific classification
- Kingdom: Plantae
- Clade: Tracheophytes
- Clade: Angiosperms
- Clade: Eudicots
- Order: Caryophyllales
- Family: Droseraceae
- Genus: Drosera
- Subgenus: Drosera subg. Drosera
- Section: Drosera sect. Thelocalyx
- Species: D. burmanni

Binomial name
- Drosera burmanni Vahl
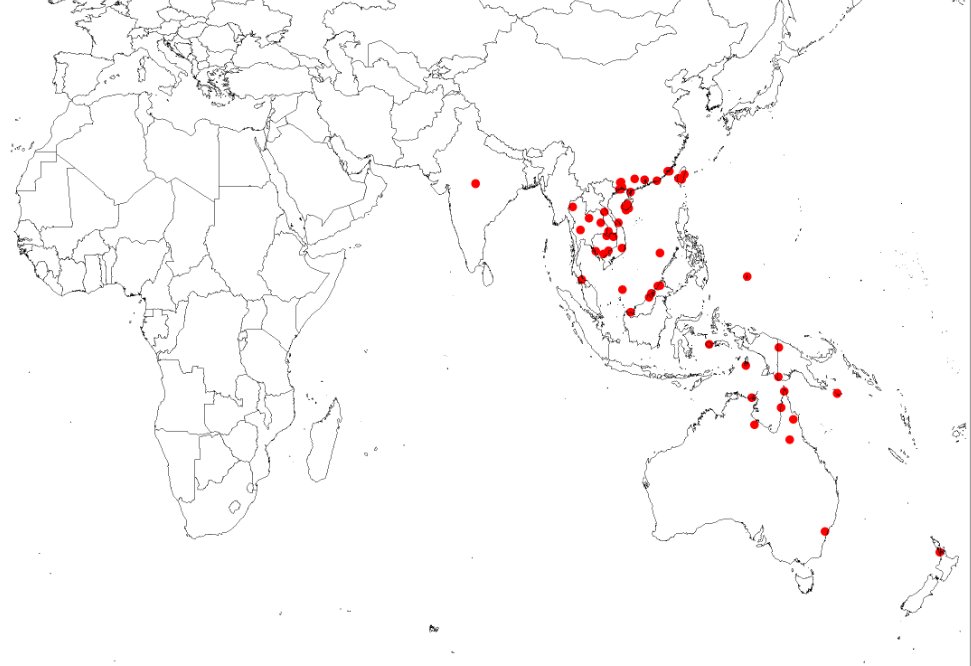
- Occurrence data from AVH and GBIF

Synonyms
- D. burmanni var. dietrichiana (Rchb.f.) Diels; D. dietrichiana Rchb.f.

= Drosera burmanni =

Species of carnivorous plant

Drosera burmanni, the tropical sundew, is a small, compact species in the carnivorous plant genus Drosera. Its natural geographical range includes the tropical and subtropical regions of Asia (India, Taiwan, Southeast Asia, and China's Guangxi, Guangdong, Yunnan, and Fujian provinces) and Australia. It is one of the fastest trapping sundews as well, and its leaves can curl around an insect in only a few seconds, compared to the minutes or hours it takes other sundews to surround their prey.

In nature, D. burmanni is an annual, but in cultivation, when grown indoors during the cold months, it can live for many years. Since D. burmanni is an annual, it produces large amounts of seed. Drosera burmanni has been considered a powerful rubefacient in Ayurveda.

== Description ==
Drosera burmanni is an herb that produces very short stems and red or green leaves in a rosette. It normally spans only 2 cm (0.8 in) in diameter. Each leaf is wedge-shaped or orbicular that grows close to the soil level, it is typically 6–10 mm long and 4–6 mm wide. White flowers are produced in groups of 3 to 10 on 6–15 cm (2–6 in) tall racemose inflorescences, of which there can be one to three per plant.

== Taxonomy ==
The first brief description of the species was written by Paul Hermann and published after Hermann's death by William Sherard in Musaeum Zeylanicum. It was described in more detail by Johannes Burman in his 1737 publication on the flora of Ceylon. Burman used the polynomial Ros solis foliis circa radicem in orbem dispositis, but the species was not formally published until 1794 when Martin Vahl named it in honor of Burman as Drosera burmanni. The species epithet is frequently modified to burmannii, however because it was derived from the Latinised form 'Burmannus' the original spelling is correct.

In 1871 Heinrich Gustav Reichenbach described a new species, D. dietrichiana, named after its discoverer Amalie Dietrich. In his 1906 monograph of the Droseraceae, Ludwig Diels reduced this species to a variety of D. burmanni. This variety was described as being a larger and more robust plant than D. burmanni var. burmanni. Both D. dietrichiana and the variety are now considered synonyms of D. burmanni.

== See also ==
- List of Drosera species

== Gallery ==
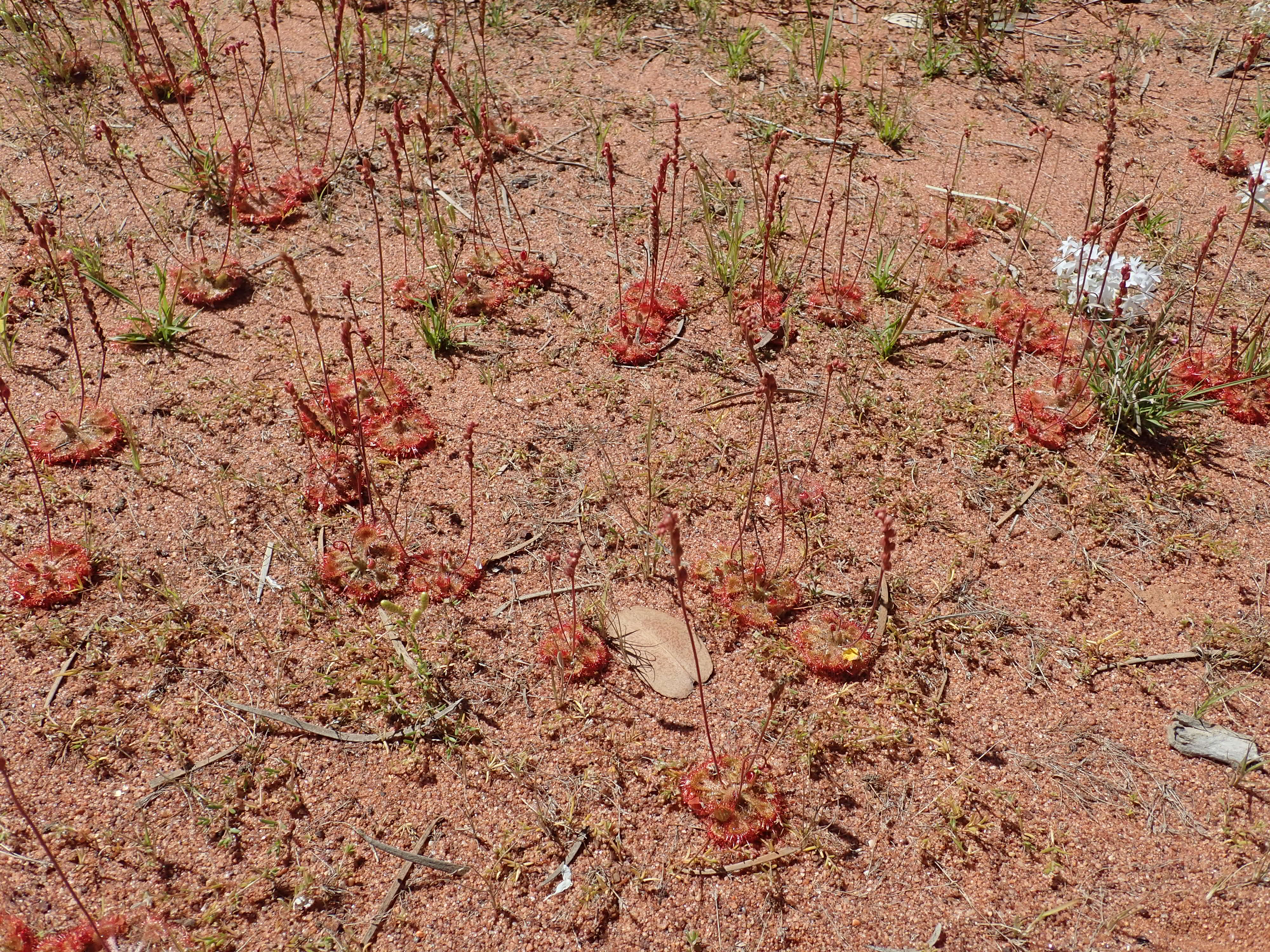
Massed plants

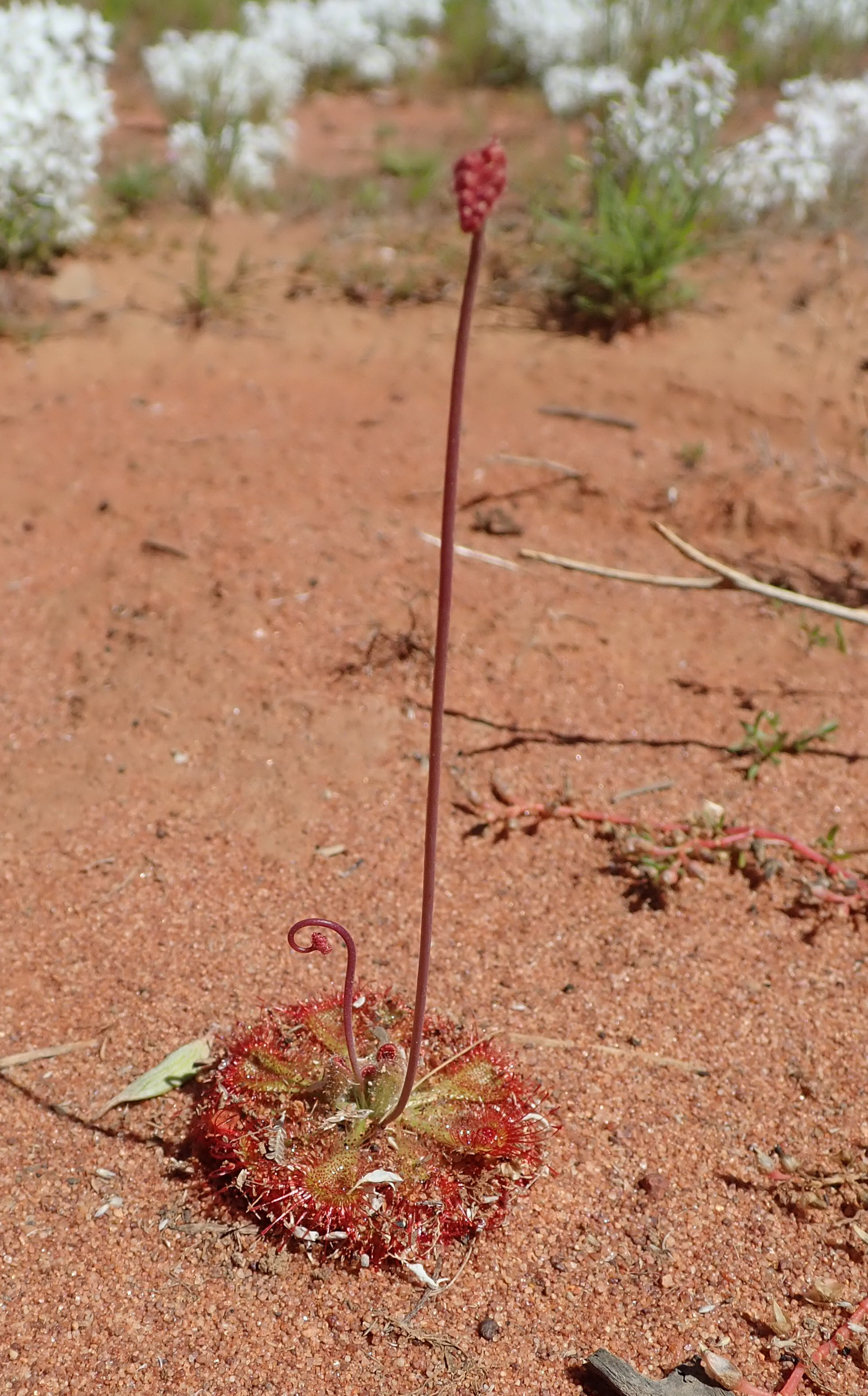
Habit

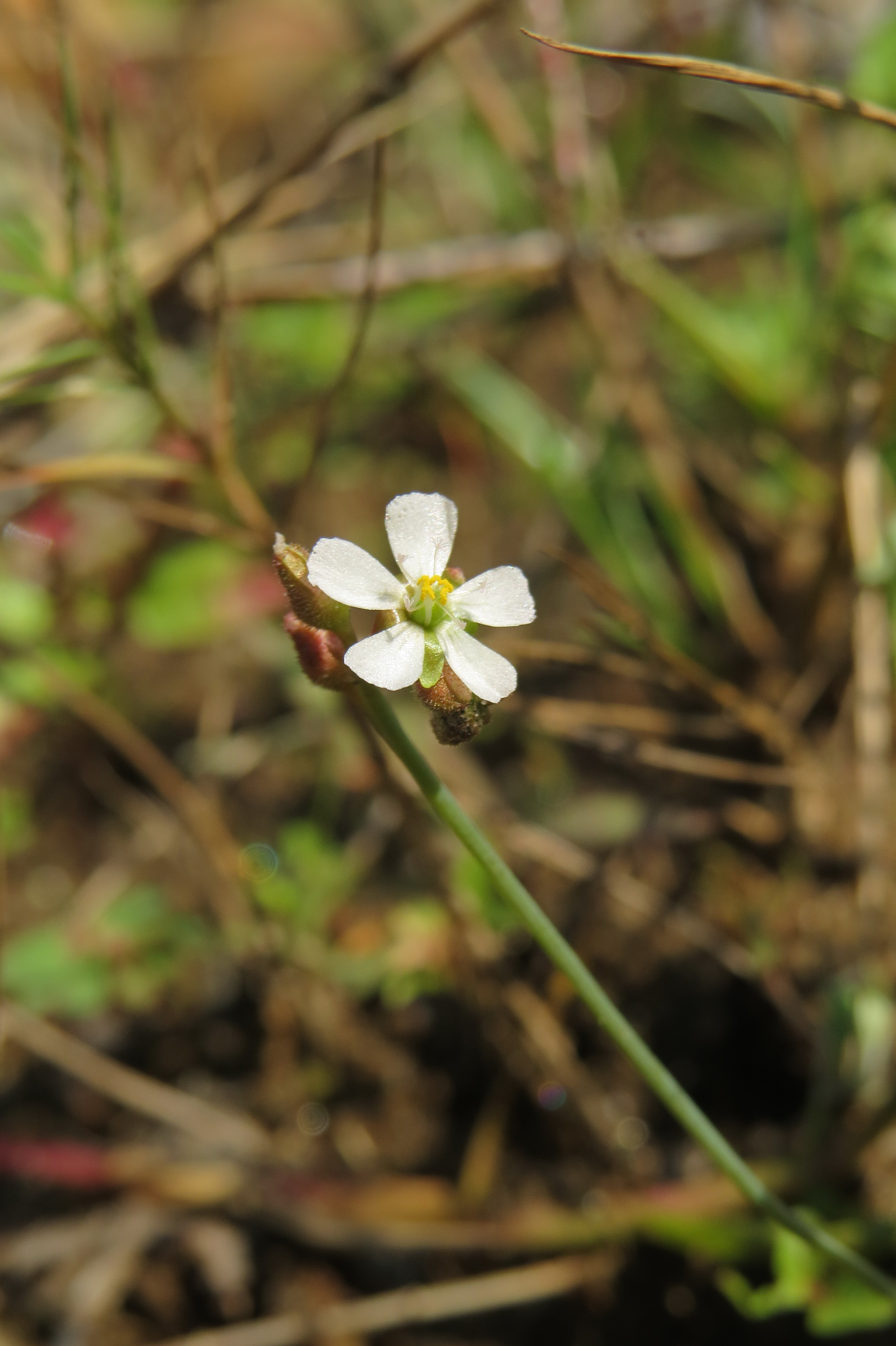
Flower

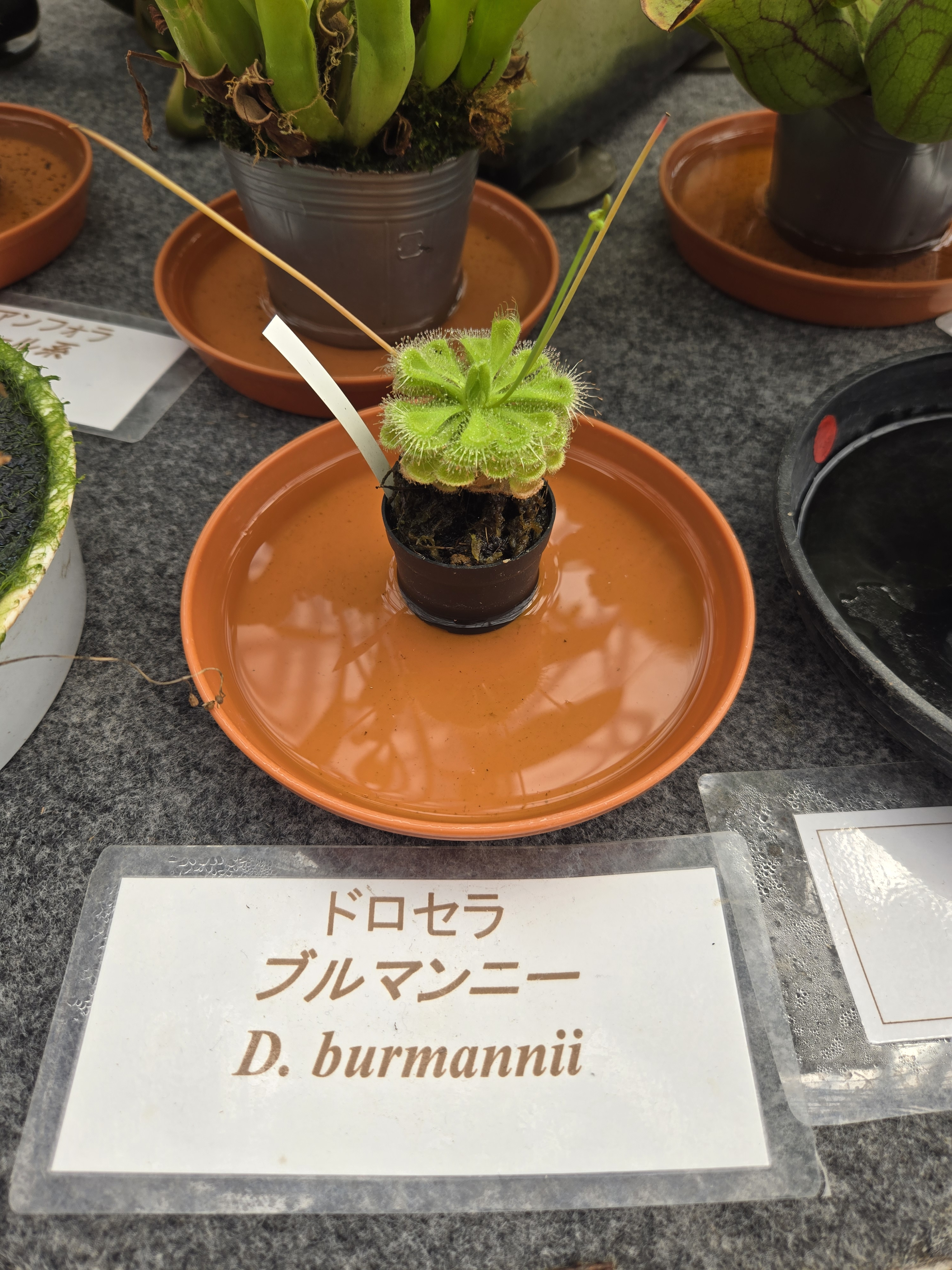
Drosera burmanni in a greenhouse.
