= Acid growth =

Ability of plants to elongate or expand under acidic conditions

Acid growth refers to the ability of plant cells and plant cell walls to elongate or expand quickly at low (acidic) pH. The cell wall needs to be modified in order to maintain the turgor pressure. This modification is controlled by plant hormones like auxin. Auxin also controls the expression of some cell wall genes. This form of growth does not involve an increase in cell number. During acid growth, plant cells enlarge rapidly because the cell walls are made more extensible by expansin, a pH-dependent wall-loosening protein. Expansin loosens the network-like connections between cellulose microfibrils within the cell wall, which allows the cell volume to increase by turgor and osmosis. A typical sequence leading up to this would involve the introduction of a plant hormone (auxin, for example) that causes protons (H^{+} ions) to be pumped out of the cell into the cell wall. As a result, the cell wall solution becomes more acidic. It was suggested by different scientist that the epidermis is a unique target of the auxin but this theory has been disapproved over time. This activates expansin activity, causing the wall to become more extensible and to undergo wall stress relaxation, which enables the cell to take up water and to expand. The acid growth theory has been very controversial in the past.
