= Expansin =

Expansins are a family of closely related nonenzymatic proteins found in the plant cell wall, with important roles in plant cell growth, fruit softening, abscission, emergence of root hairs, pollen tube invasion of the stigma and style, meristem function, and other developmental processes where cell wall loosening occurs. Expansins were originally discovered as mediators of acid growth, which refers to the widespread characteristic of growing plant cell walls to expand faster at low (acidic) pH than at neutral pH. Expansins are thus linked to auxin action. They are also linked to cell enlargement and cell wall changes induced by other plant hormones such as gibberellin, cytokinin, ethylene and brassinosteroids.

A subset of the β-expansins are also the major group-1 allergens of grass pollens.

== Families ==
So far, two large families of expansin genes have been discovered in plants, named alpha-expansins (given the gene symbol EXPA) and beta-expansins (EXPB). Both families of expansins have been identified in a wide range of land plants, from angiosperms and gymnosperms to ferns and mosses. The model plant Arabidopsis thaliana contains around 26 different α-expansin genes and 6 β-expansin genes. A subset of β-expansins has evolved a special role in grass pollen, where they are known as group 1 grass pollen allergens. Plants also have a small set of expansin-like genes (named EXLA and EXLB) whose function has not been established. Some proteins in bacteria and fungi are known to have distant sequence similarity to plant expansins. Strong evidence that at least some of these sequences are indeed expansins came in 2008 when the crystal structure of the YOAJ protein from a bacterium (Bacillus subtilis) was shown to be very similar to the structure of plant expansins, despite the low sequence similarity. This study also noted that proteins related to YOAJ were found in diverse species of plant pathogenic bacteria, but not in related bacteria that did not attack or colonize plants, thus suggesting that these bacterial expansins have a role in plant-microbe interactions. Some animals, such as Globodera rostochiensis, a plant-parasitic nematode, can produce a functional expansin which uses it to loosen cell walls when invading its host plant.

To be designated as expansin or expansin-like, genes and their protein products must contain both domain I (N-terminal, catalytic, GH45-like - GH meaning glycoside-hydrolase) and domain II (C-terminal, distantly related to group-2 grass pollen allergens). Non-plant expansins can be designated with the symbol EXLX (expansin-like X), but they do not constitute a monophyletic group; distantly similar to plant expansins, they could have diverged prior to the origin of land plants, or else could have been acquired by horizontal transfer.

Nomenclature of genes and proteins of expansins and expansin-like: e.g., Arabidopsis thaliana EXPANSIN A1 is named "AtEXPA1" as for the gene, and "AtEXPA1" as for the protein; one adds "-1" for mutant allele 1.

== Actions ==
Expansins characteristically cause wall stress relaxation and irreversible wall extension (wall creep). This process is essential for cell enlargement. Expansins are also expressed in ripening fruit where they function in fruit softening, and in grass pollen, where they loosen stigmatic cell walls and aid pollen tube penetration of the stigmain germinating seeds for cell wall disassembly, in floral organs for their patterning, in developing nitrogen-fixing nodules in legumes, in abscessing leaves, in parasitic plants, and in ‘resurrection’ plants during their rehydration. No enzymatic activity has been found for expansin and in particular, no glucanase activity: they don't hydrolyze the matrix polysaccharides; the only definitive assay for expansin activity is thus to measure wall stress relaxation or wall extension.

== Structure and regulation ==
Expansins are proteins; the two expansins initially uncovered had molecular weights of 29 kDa (kilodalton) and 30 kDa, which would correspond to around 270 amino acids on average. Generally speaking, α- and β-expansins and expansin-like are composed of approximately 300 amino acids, with a MW of ~25–28 kDa for the mature protein. The peptidic sequence of an expansin consists, in particular, of: a signal peptide of around 20–30 amino acids at the N-terminal end, the putative catalytic domain, a His-Phe-Asp (HFD) motif in central region (except EXL), and the C-terminal putative cellulose-binding domain with conserved Trp (tryptophan) residues. Sequence analysis of expansin genes shows seven introns named A, B, C, D, E, F, and G; sequences from different expansin genes show good correspondence, the exon/intron organization being conserved among α- and β-expansins, and expansin-like genes, although the number of introns and the length of each intron differ among genes. In the N-terminal signal sequences of α-expansin genes, the general absence of endoplasmic reticulum retention signal (KDEL or HDEL) confirms that the proteins are targeted to the cell wall. A promoter analysis of expansin genes indicates that expression of these genes may be regulated by auxin, gibberellin, cytokinin or ethylene, this being more frequent in α-expansins than in β-expansins; semi-aquatic plants such as Rumex palustris, which are induced to grow rapidly by submergence, show a transcription induction by submergence, the same as in rice where hypoxia and submergence increase α-expansin mRNA levels.

== Mechanism ==
The plant cell wall has high tensile strength and must be loosened to enable the cell to grow (enlarge irreversibly). Within the cell wall, this expansion of surface area involves slippage or movement of cellulose microfibrils, which normally is coupled to simultaneous uptake of water. In physical terms, this mode of wall expansion requires cell turgor pressure to stretch the cell wall and put the network of interlinked cellulose microfibrils under tension. By loosening the linkages between cellulose microfibrils, expansins allow the wall to yield to the tensile stresses created in the wall through turgor pressure. The molecular mechanism by which expansin loosens the cellulosic network within the cell wall is not yet established in detail. However, expansin is hypothesized to disrupt the non-covalent adhesion or entrapment of hemicellulose on the surface of cellulose microfibrils. Hemicelluloses can tether cellulose microfibrils together, forming a strong load-bearing network. Expansin is thought to disrupt the cellulose-hemicellulose association transiently, allowing slippage or movement of cell wall polymers before the association reforms and the integrity of the cell wall network is reestablished.

Turning to the function of bacterial expansins, the bacterial protein named YOAJ or BsEXLX1 binds to plant and bacterial cell walls and has weak but significant expansin activity, that is, it induces plant cell wall extension in vitro. Moreover, B. subtilis mutants lacking BsEXLX1 were defective in colonizing plant roots, suggesting that this protein facilitates plant-bacterium interactions.

== Allergenicity ==
In grass pollens, the major allergens (group-1 allergens, main causative agents of hay fever and of seasonal asthma) are structurally linked to a sub-group of the β-expansins. These expansins appear specialized in pollination, likely in loosening the cell walls of the maternal tissues during penetration of the pollen tube into the stigma and style, as is suggested by their potent rheological effect on grass style and stigma walls, where they are abundantly released by the pollen. Expansin-like proteins are implicated in group-2 and -3 grass allergenes, less important than those of group-1. These three allergens groups share a carbohydrate-binding module (CBM), which could be responsible for the binding to the IgE antibody. The expansin domain II, causative of the allergenic effects, could be related to the competition between pollens for access to ovules.

== See also ==
- Cellulose
- Plant cell wall
- Acid growth
