= Drosera longifolia =

Drosera longifolia L. is a rejected, ambiguous name that has been applied to two species of carnivorous plant:

- Drosera anglica
- Drosera intermedia
