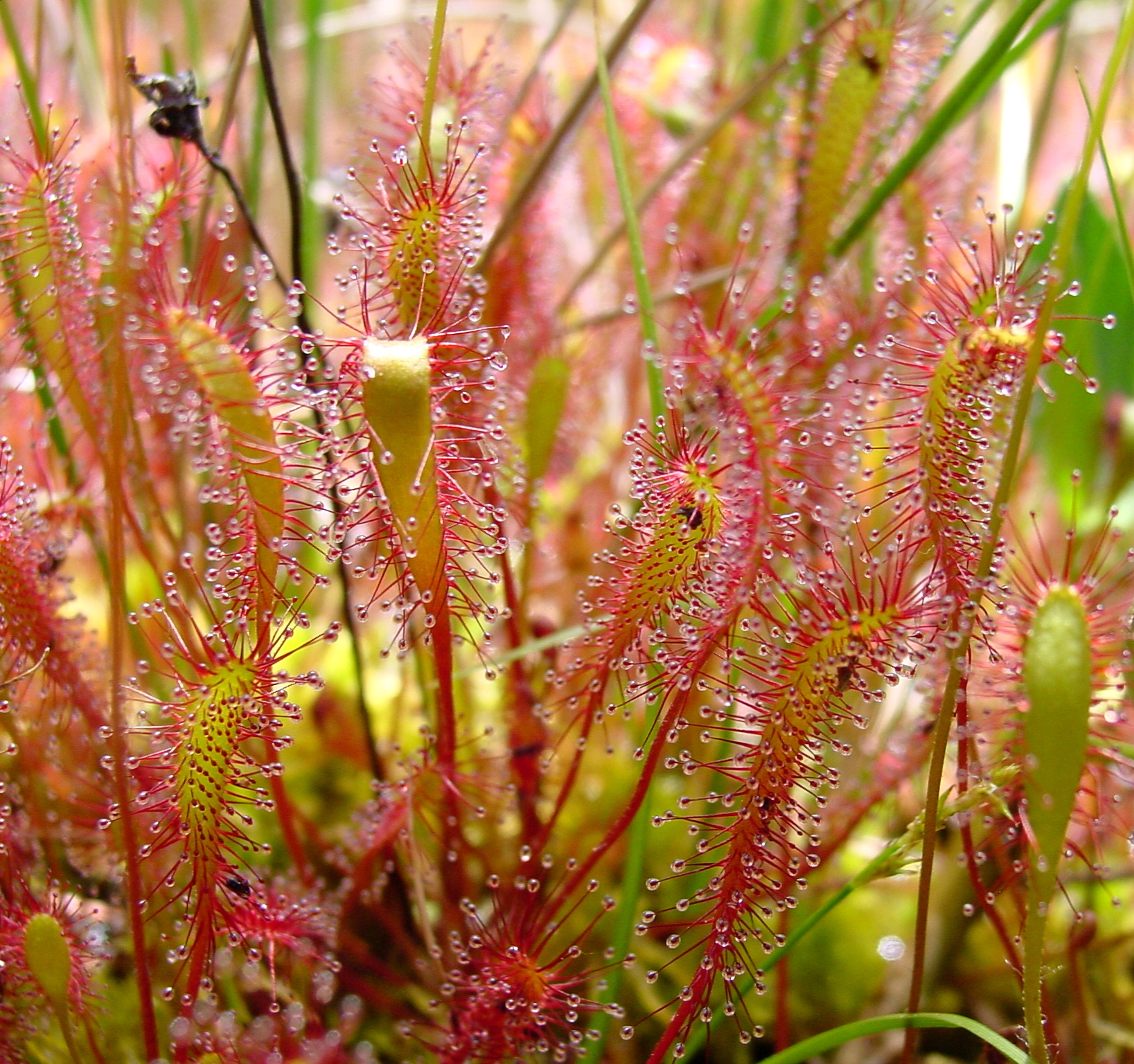

Conservation status
- Secure (NatureServe)

Scientific classification
- Kingdom: Plantae
- Clade: Tracheophytes
- Clade: Angiosperms
- Clade: Eudicots
- Order: Caryophyllales
- Family: Droseraceae
- Genus: Drosera
- Subgenus: Drosera subg. Drosera
- Section: Drosera sect. Drosera
- Species: D. anglica

Binomial name
- Drosera anglica Huds.

Synonyms
- List: Adenopa anglica (Huds.) Raf.; Drosera anglica f. pusilla Kihlm. ex Diels; Drosera anglica var. subuniflora DC.; Drosera kihlmanii Ikonn.; Drosera longifolia L.; Drosera longifolia var. major Wahlenb.; Drosera longifolia var. major Wahlenb.; Drosera longifolia var. vulgaris W.D.J.Koch; Drosera macedonica Košanin; Drosera septentrionalis var. oblongifolia Stokes; Rorella longifolia (L.) All.

= Drosera anglica =

Species of carnivorous plant

Drosera anglica, commonly known as the English sundew or great sundew, is a carnivorous flowering plant species belonging to the sundew family Droseraceae. It is a temperate species with a circumboreal range, although it does occur as far south as Japan, southern Europe, and the island of Kauaʻi in Hawaii, where it grows as a tropical sundew. It is thought to originate from an amphidiploid hybrid of D. rotundifolia and D. linearis, meaning that a sterile hybrid between these two species doubled its chromosomes to produce fertile progeny which stabilized into the current D. anglica.

== Morphology ==
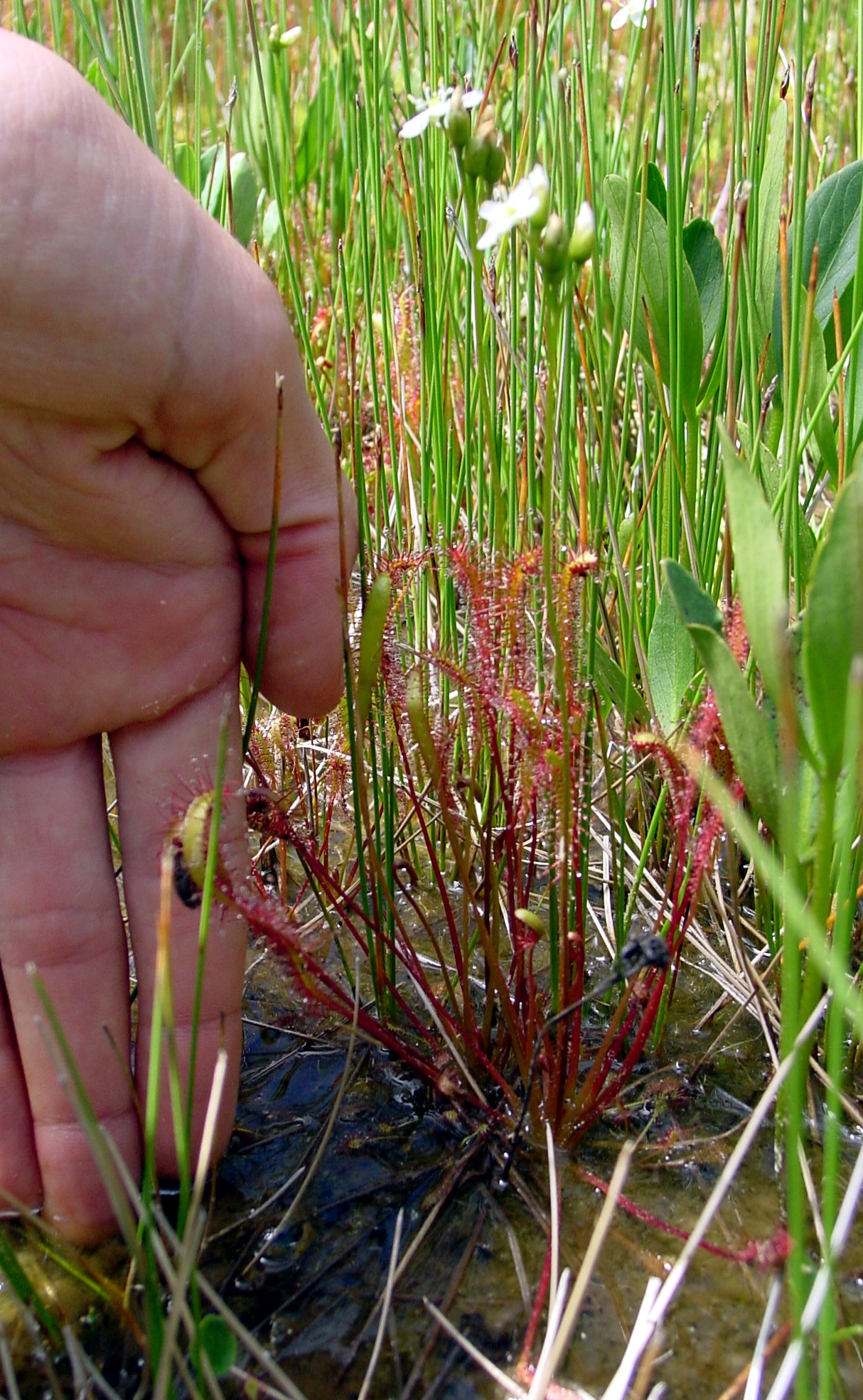
A large D. anglica plant with hand for scale

Drosera anglica is a perennial herb which forms an upright, stemless rosette of generally linear-spatulate leaves. As is typical for sundews, the laminae are densely covered with stalked reddish colored mucilaginous glands, each tipped with a clear droplet of a viscous fluid used for trapping insects. The lamina, which is 15–35 millimetres (0.59–1.38 in) long, is held semi-erect by a long petiole, bringing the total leaf size to 30–95 millimetres (1.2–3.7 in). Plants are green, coloring red in bright light. In all populations except those in Kauaʻi, D. anglica forms winter resting buds called hibernacula. These consist of a knot of tightly curled leaves at ground level, which unfurl in spring at the end of the dormancy period. The root system is weak and penetrates only a few centimeters, serving mainly as an anchor and for water absorption. Nitrogen is in short supply in bogs and trapping and digesting insects provides an alternate source.

Drosera anglica flowers in the summer, sending up peduncles 6–18 centimetres (2.4–7.1 in). long bearing several white flowers which open individually. Like other sundews, the flowers have five sepals, petals, and stamens with three styles. The petals for this species are 8–12 mm (¼ to ½") long, and the flowers have branched 2-lobed styles. The odorless, nectar-less flowers do not rely on insect pollinators for pollination, rather setting seed well through self-pollination (autogamy). The black roundish spindle-shaped seeds, are 1 to 1 1/2 mm long. The fruits are a dehiscent three-valved capsule.

== Carnivory ==
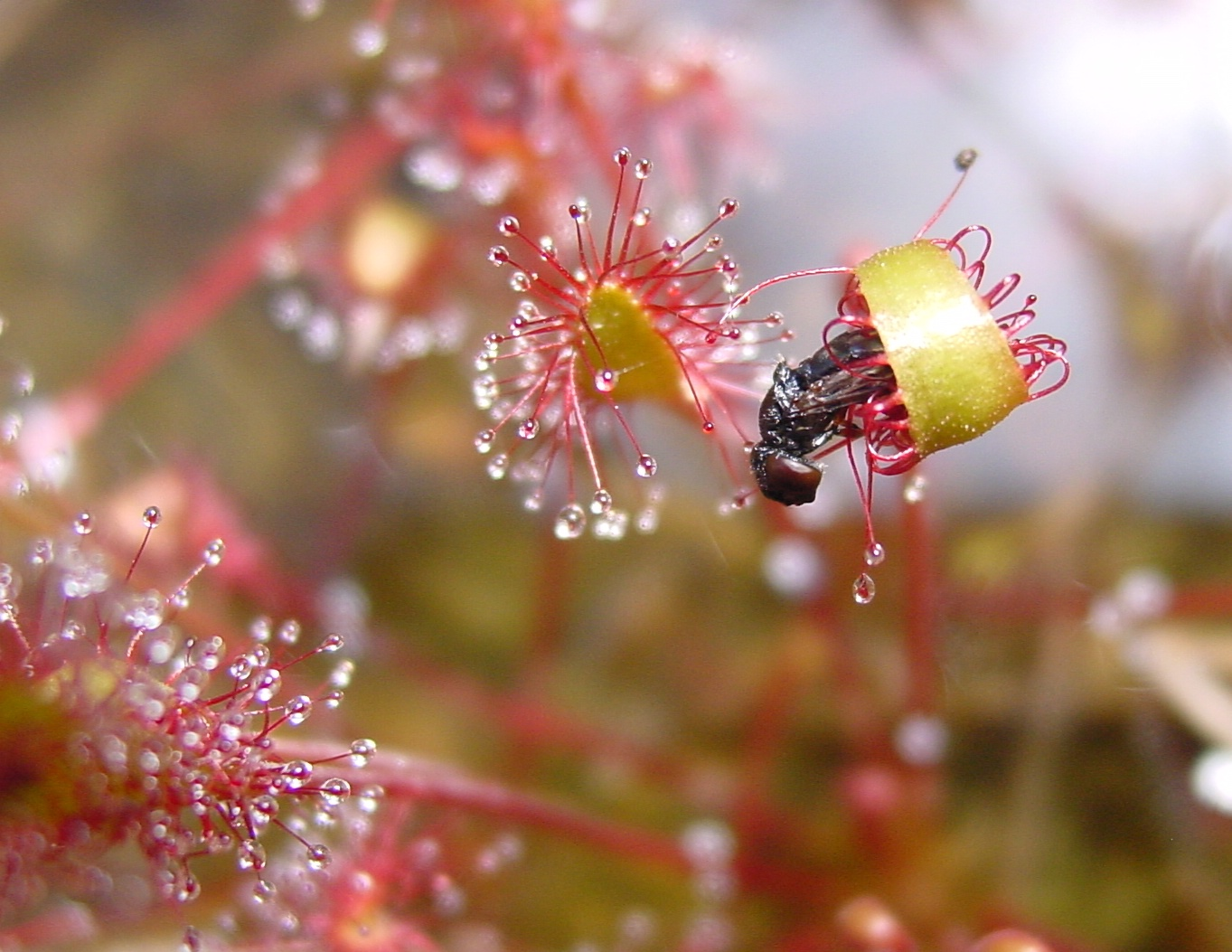
A D. anglica leaf bent around a trapped fly

Like all sundews, D. anglica uses stalked mucilaginous glands called tentacles which cover its laminae to attract, trap, and digest small arthropods, usually insects. These are attracted by a sugary scent exuded by the glands, and upon alighting on the plant adhere to the sticky drops of mucilage. Although most of its prey consists of small insects such as flies, bulkier insects with large wings are also caught. Small butterflies, damselflies, and even dragonflies can become immobilized by the plant's sticky mucilage.

The plant's initial response to contact with prey consists of thigmotropic (movement in response to touch) tentacle movement, with tentacles bending toward the prey and the center of the leaf to maximize contact. D. anglica is also capable of further movement, being able to bend the actual leaf blade around prey to further the digestion process. Tentacle movement can occur in a matter of minutes, whereas the leaf takes hours or days to bend. When something gets caught, the tentacles touching the prey exude additional mucilage to mire down the prey, which eventually dies of exhaustion or is asphyxiated as the mucilage clogs its tracheae. Once the prey has been digested and the resulting nutrient solution has been absorbed by the plant, the leaf unfurls, leaving only the prey's exoskeleton behind.

== Taxonomy ==
Drosera anglica was given its first scientific description and named by the botanist William Hudson in 1778. Constantine Samuel Rafinesque proposed moving it and other species to a new genus named Adenopa in 1837, but this was not accepted.

== Habitat ==
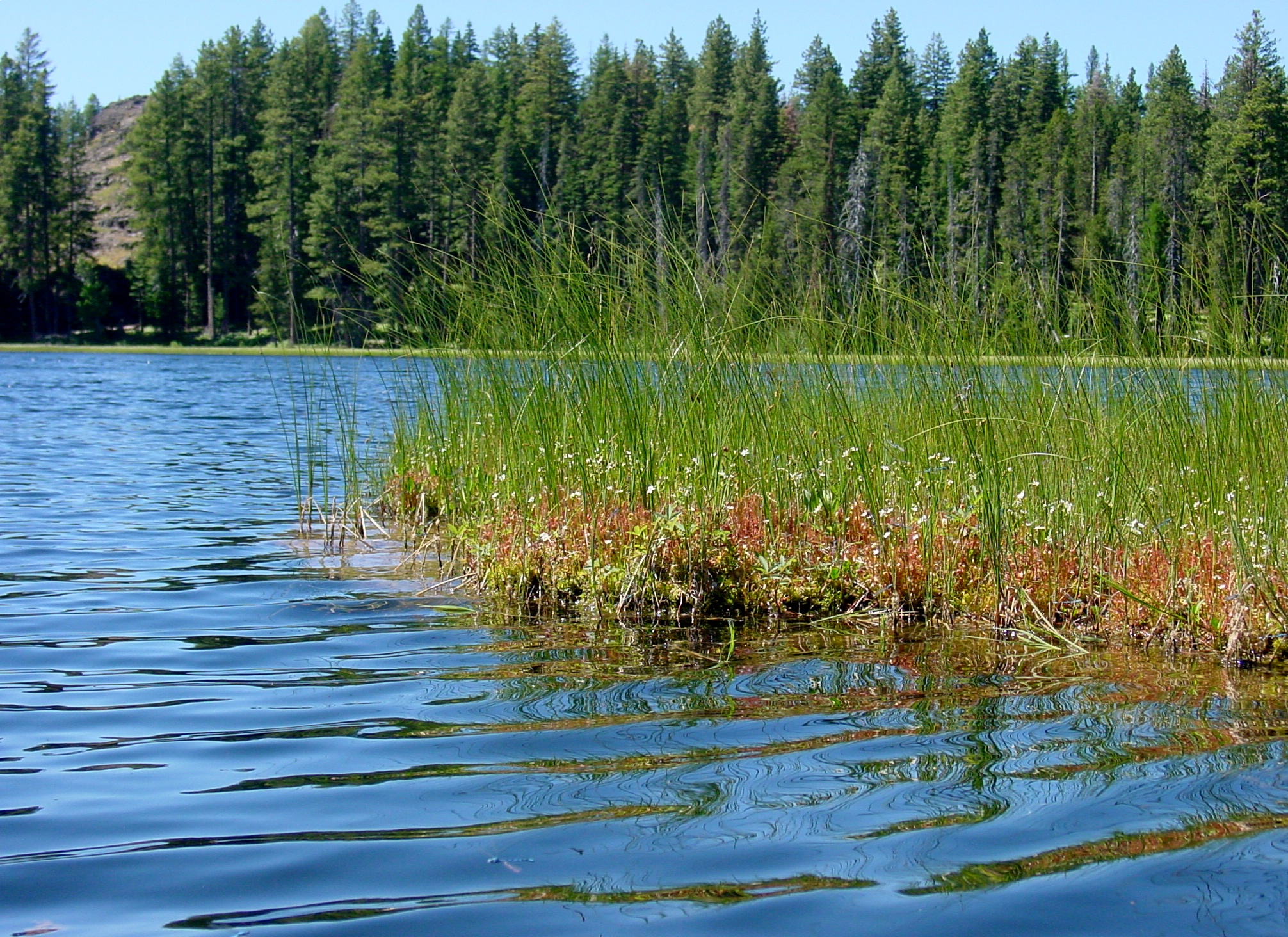
D. anglica growing on a quaking bog in the Wallowa Mountains of Oregon

Drosera anglica grows in open, non-forested habitat with wet, often calcium-rich soils. These include bogs, marl fens, quaking bogs, cobble shores, and other calcareous habitats. This tolerance of calcium is relatively rare in the rest of the genus. D. anglica is often associated with various sphagnum mosses, and many times grows in a soil substrate that is entirely composed of living, dead, or decomposed sphagnum. The sphagnum wicks moisture to the surface while simultaneously acidifying it. What soil nutrients are not seeped away by the constant moisture are often used up by the sphagnum or made unavailable by the low soil pH. Since nutrient availability is low, competition from other plants is diminished, allowing the carnivorous English sundew to flourish.

== Distribution ==
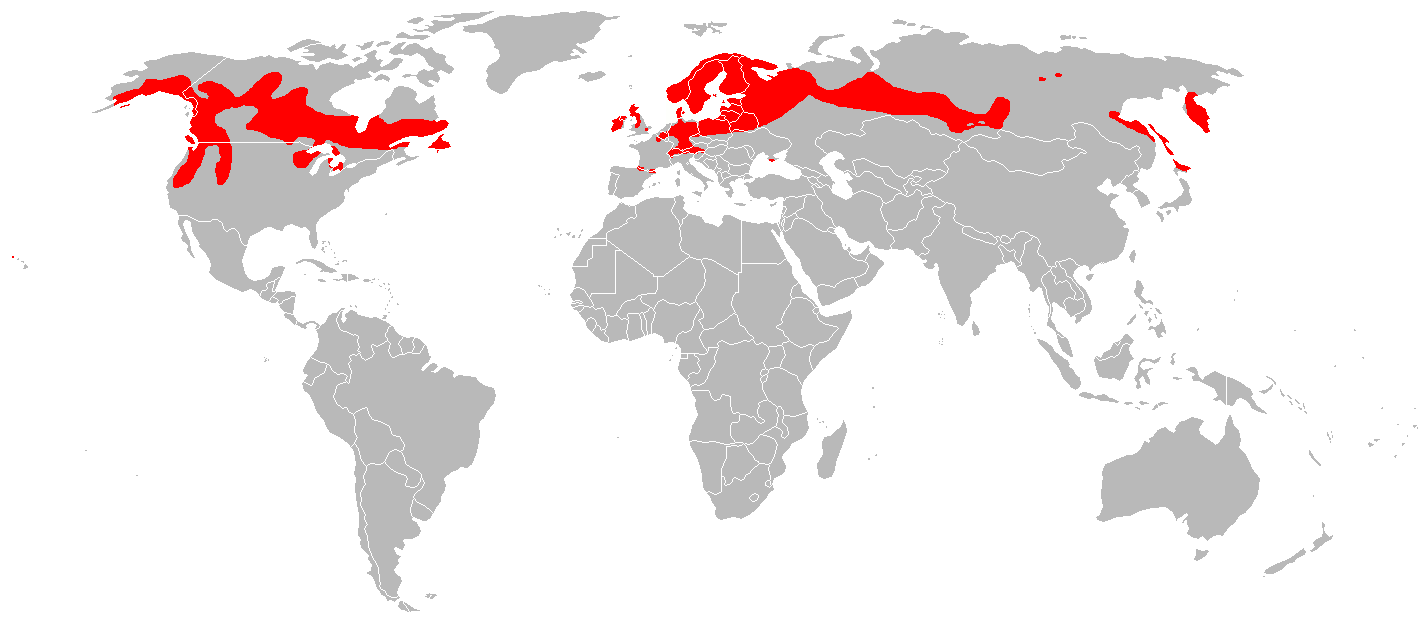
World distribution of D. anglica

Drosera anglica is one of the most widely distributed sundews in the world. It is generally circumboreal, meaning that it is found at high latitudes around the globe. In a few areas, however, it is found farther south, particularly in Japan, southern Europe, the Hawaiian island of Kauaʻi, and California. Plants from Hawaii, where it is known as mikinalo, are generally smaller than normal and do not experience a winter dormancy period. Its natural habitat includes 12 U.S. states, including Alaska, and 11 Canadian provinces and territories. The altitudinal range is from 5 metres (16 ft) to at least 2,000 metres (6,600 ft). In the US state of Minnesota, it was found in 1978 growing in shallow pools in peatlands with minerotrophic water dominated by low growing mosses and sedge species; because of its limited to small populations, and the type of microhabitats that it occupies, it is listed as a threatened species in the state.

== Special origins ==
All North American Drosera species except for D. anglica have a chromosome count of 2n=20. In 1955, Wood noted that D. anglica had a chromosome count of 2n=40, and hypothesized that it was of hybrid amphidiploid origin. Since the leaf morphology of D. anglica is an intermediary between that of D. rotundifolia and D. linearis and the two occur sympatrically in several locations, Wood conjectured that D. anglica likely originated from a hybrid between these two.

All North American Drosera species produce sterile hybrids. The natural hybrid D. rotundifolia × D. linearis (conventionally but incorrectly referred to as Drosera ×anglica), is also sterile but is morphologically similar to the modern D. anglica. Errors in meiosis during ovule and pollen production, however, can result in a chromosome doubling which can allow for viable seed to be produced. The resulting plants, known as amphiploids, would be fertile. Woods noted that this appeared to be an ongoing process with D. anglica speciating from D. rotundifolia × D. linearis through amphidiploidy in multiple locations. The question remains as to why D. anglica is so widespread, whereas the range of D. linearis is limited to the Great Lakes region of North America. The greater adaptability of D. anglica to varied habitat conditions could be a major factor.

== Botanical history ==
Drosera anglica was first described by William Hudson in 1778. It has frequently been confused with the other circumpolar long-leaf Drosera, D. intermedia. This confusion was fueled by the resurfacing of an older name, D. longifolia (described by Carl Linnaeus in 1753), which was regarded as being too ambiguous in description and had been applied to specimens of both D. anglica and D. intermedia. Herbarium specimens were also a mix of the two species. These points led Martin Cheek to propose D. longifolia for rejection as a species name in 1998. The proposal was accepted and the taxon listed as rejected in 1999.

== Hybrids ==
Several naturally occurring hybrids involving D. anglica exist. These include:

D. anglica × capillaris	= D. × anpil
D. anglica × filiformis	= D. × anfil
D. anglica × linearis
D. anglica × intermedia	= D. × anterm
D. anglica × spatulata	= D. × nagamoto
D. linearis × anglica	= D. × linglica
D. rotundifolia × anglica	= D. × obovata

These are all sterile. In addition, several man-made hybrids have been made.

== Gallery ==
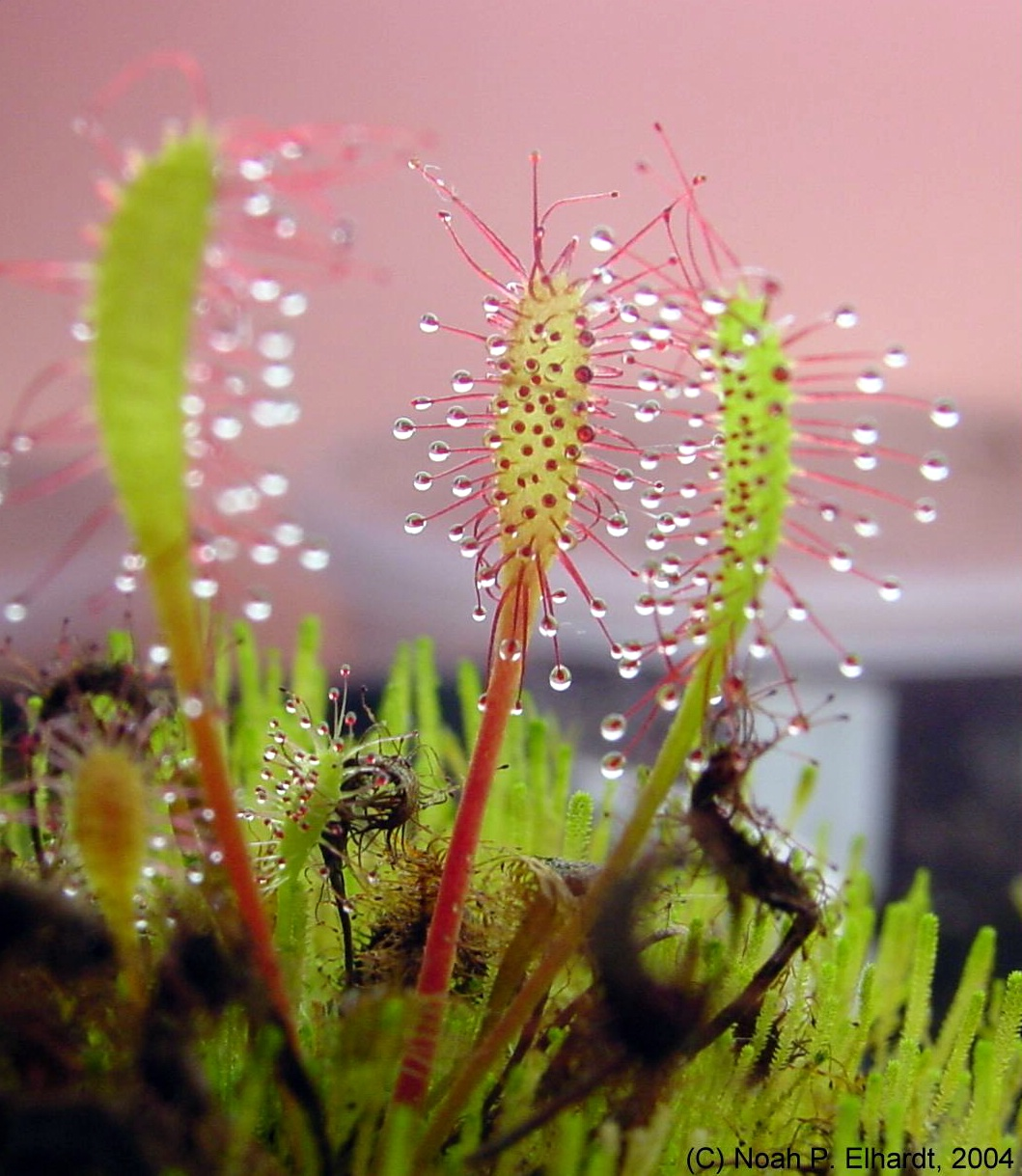
Tropical form from Kauaʻi, Hawaii

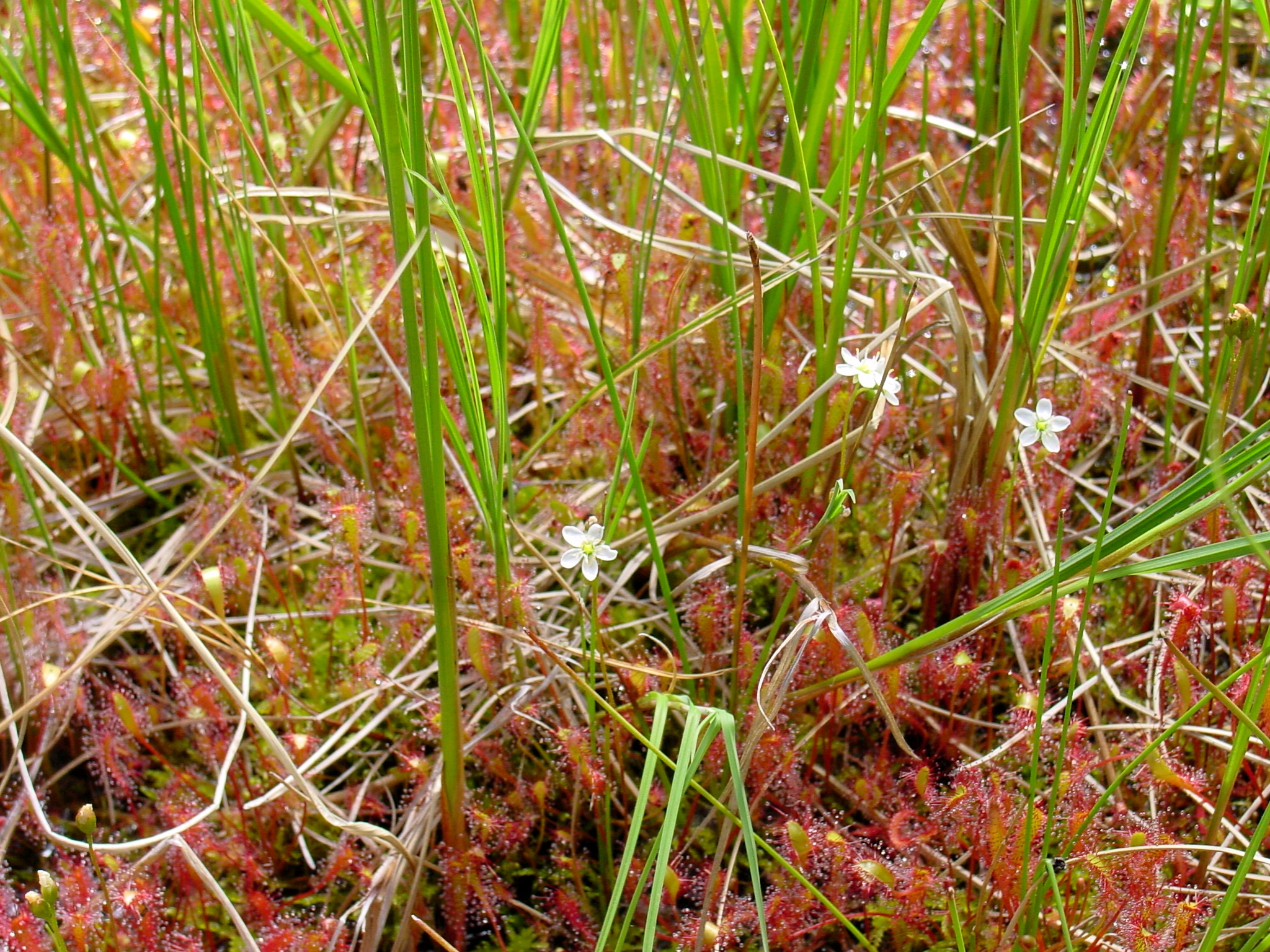
A dense carpet of flowering D. anglica on a quaking bog

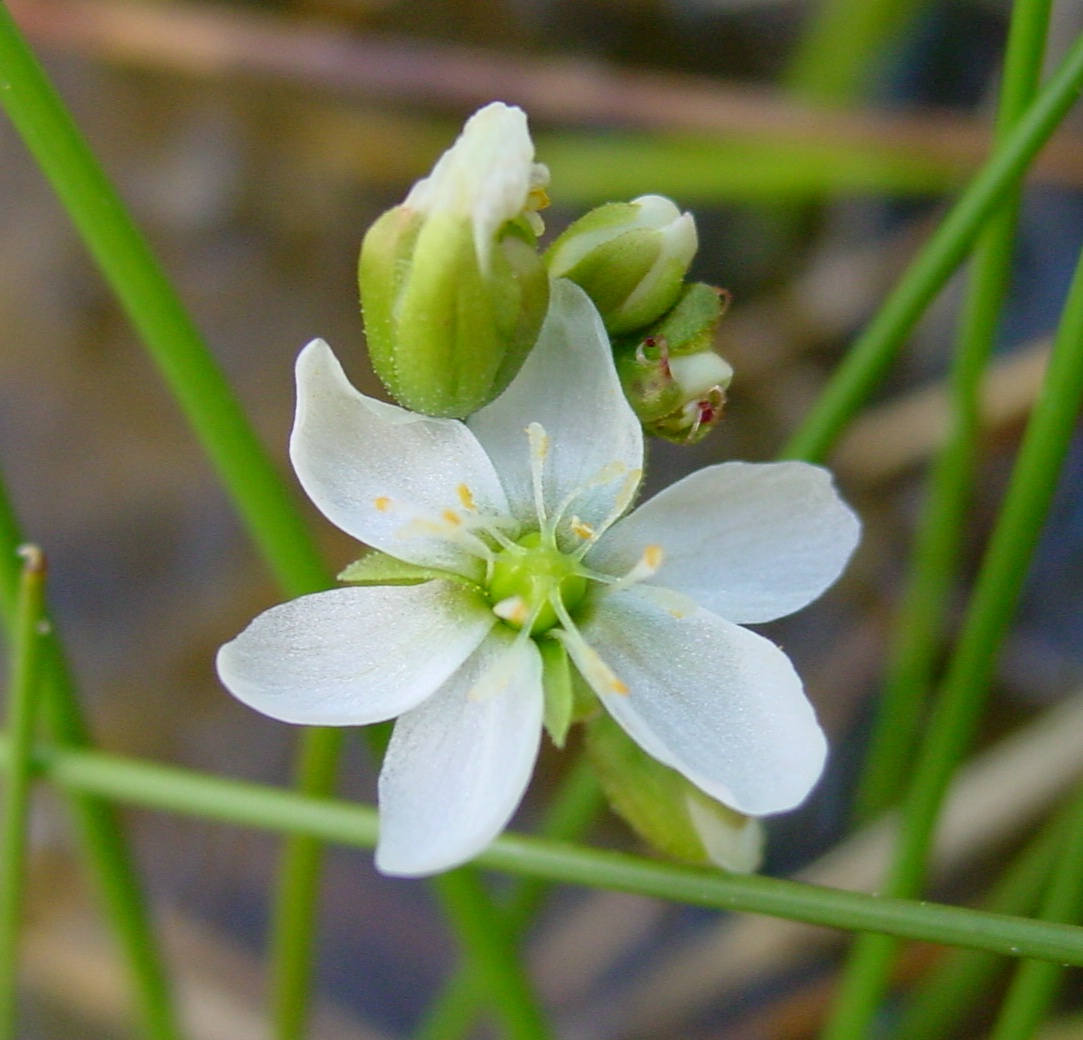
An atypical D. anglica flower with 6 petals

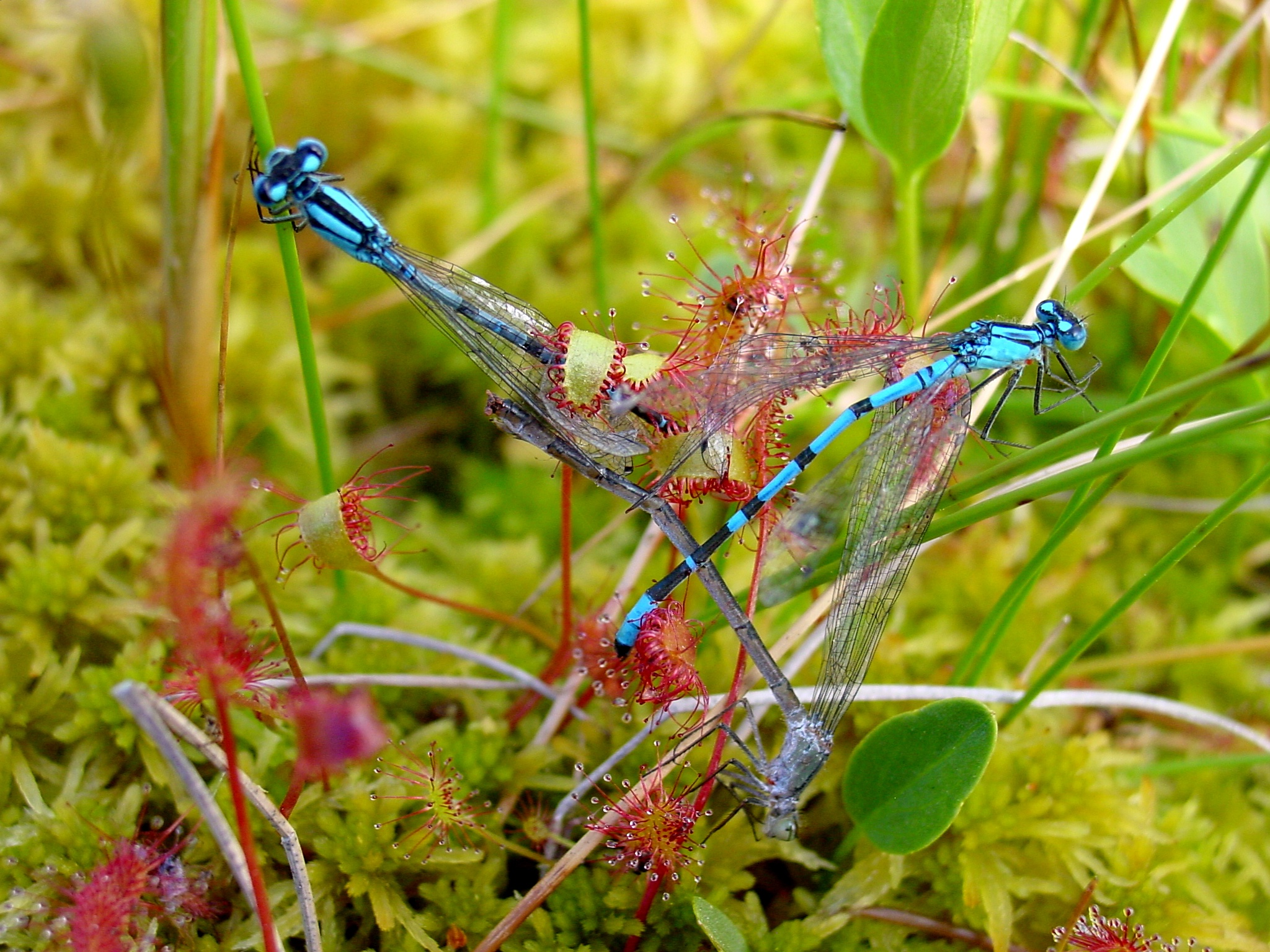
Several damselflies ensnared by some English sundews

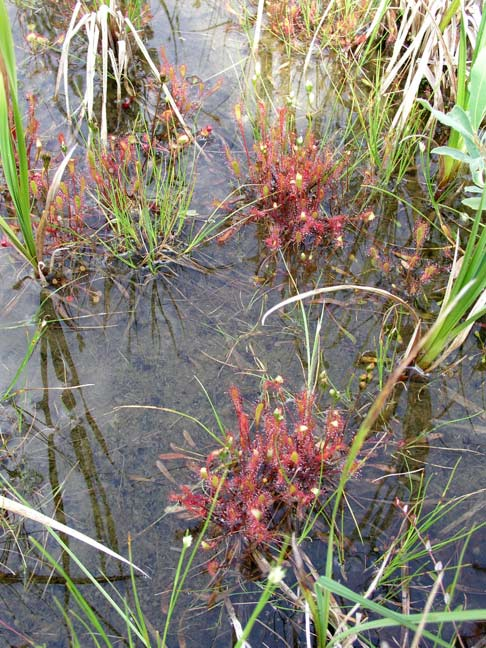
D. anglica growing in a mountain bog, British Columbia, Canada
