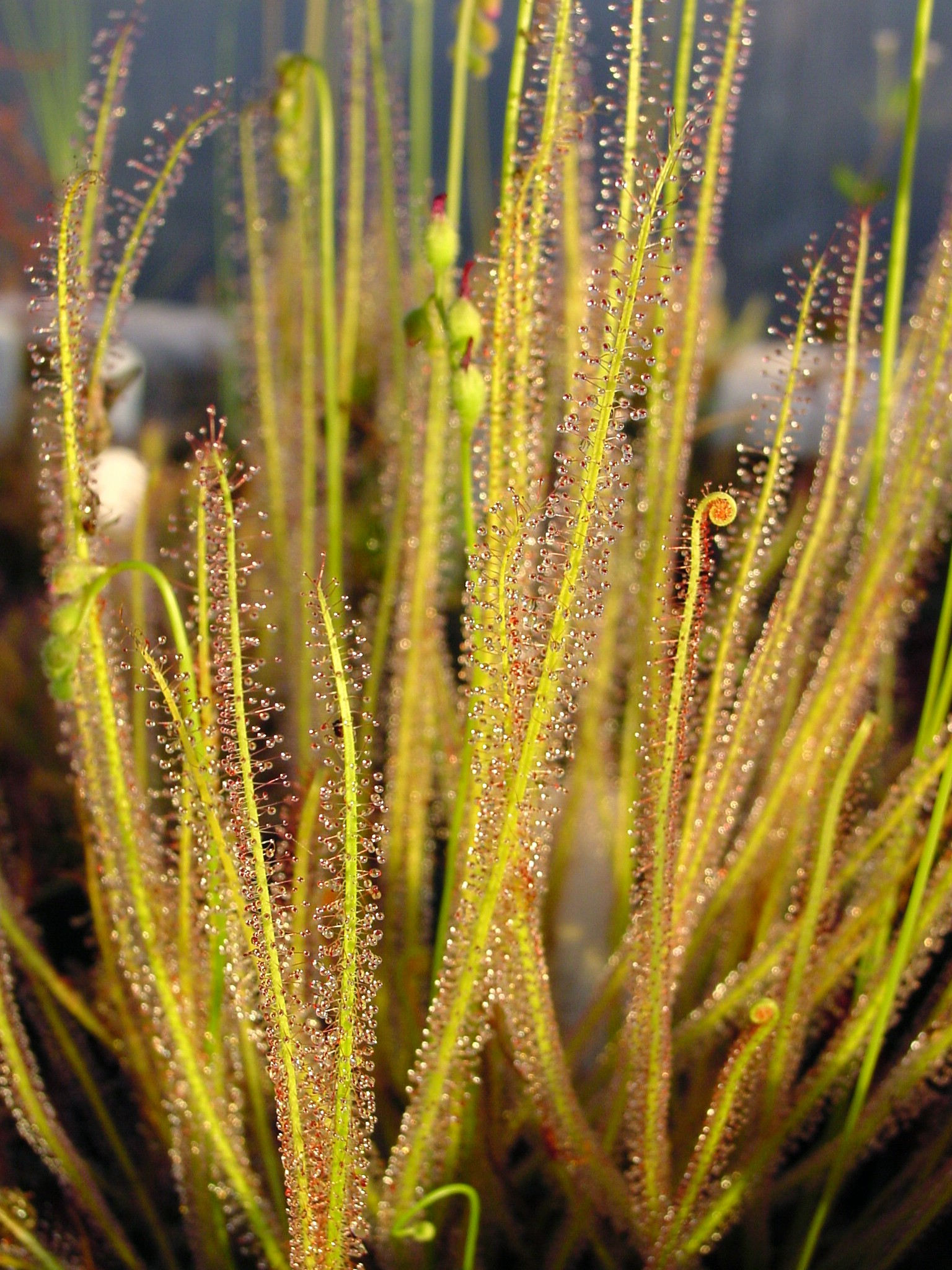

Conservation status
- Least Concern (IUCN 3.1)

Scientific classification
- Kingdom: Plantae
- Clade: Embryophytes
- Clade: Tracheophytes
- Clade: Spermatophytes
- Clade: Angiosperms
- Clade: Eudicots
- Order: Caryophyllales
- Family: Droseraceae
- Genus: Drosera
- Subgenus: Drosera subg. Drosera
- Section: Drosera sect. Drosera
- Species: D. filiformis

Binomial name
- Drosera filiformis Raf. (1808)

Synonyms
- Drosera filiformis auct. non Raf.: R.Hamet (1907) [=D. filiformis/D. filiformis var. tracyi/D. filiformis × D. intermedia]; Drosera leionema Raf. (1836); Drosera tenuifolia Willd. (1809); Drosera tracyi Macf. ex Diels (1906); Filicirna filiformis (Raf.) Raf. (1836); Filicirna leionema (Raf.) Raf. (1836); Filicirna tenuifolia (Willd.) Raf. (1836)

= Drosera filiformis =

Thread-leaved sundew

Species of carnivorous plant

Drosera filiformis, commonly known as the thread-leaved sundew, is a small, insectivorous, rosette-forming species of perennial herb. A species of sundew, it is unusual within its genus in that the long, erect, filiform (thread-like) leaves of this plant unroll in spirals – an arrangement similar to the circinate vernation seen in ferns.

== Distribution and habitat ==
D. filiformis occurs naturally in both Canada and the United States; its natural range extends down the eastern seaboard of North America from south western Nova Scotia in the north down through New England to Florida in the south. Its disjunct distribution on the Atlantic Coast reflects the prehistoric land connection between Nova Scotia and Cape Cod, Massachusetts, which formed an ancient extension of the Atlantic Plain region that likely persisted well into the current interglacial period as an island chain.

== Cultivation ==
D. filiformis is frequently cultivated, with a few registered cultivars, such as D. filiformis var. filiformis (also known as D. filiformis typical), D. filiformis × 'California Sunset' (a hybrid between D. filiformis var. filiformis.) All of these cultivars are grown with similar conditions as most other Drosera species: mineral-poor soil and distilled, reverse osmosis, or collected rain water. D. filiformis require a winter dormancy for long-term survival, forming hibernacula in the winter.

== Conservation ==
D. filiformis is a Schedule 1–listed endangered species of Canada under the Species at Risk Act. It is considered range-wide to be of "least concern" according to the International Union for Conservation of Nature. Threats include development, peat mining and competition from shrubs.

== Infraspecific taxa ==
- Drosera filiformis var. filiformis f. rubriflora*
- Drosera filiformis var. filiformis f. viridis*
- Drosera filiformis var. floridana*
- Drosera filiformis var. floridana f. albiflora*
