= Hibernaculum =

Hibernaculum (hi-buhr-NAK-yuh-luhm) (Latin, "tent for winter quarters") may refer to:

- Hibernaculum (zoology), the location chosen by an animal for hibernation. Commonly this may be a hibernating mammal or insect.
- Hibernaculum (botany), a bud, case, or protective covering that a plant uses to survive the challenging environmental conditions during a dormancy period
- "Hibernaculum" (song), a single by Mike Oldfield from his The Songs of Distant Earth album, 1994
- Hibernaculum (album), by the band Earth, 2007
- "Hibernaculum" (Grimm) the 17th episode of season 4 of the supernatural drama television series Grimm
