= Hibernaculum (botany) =

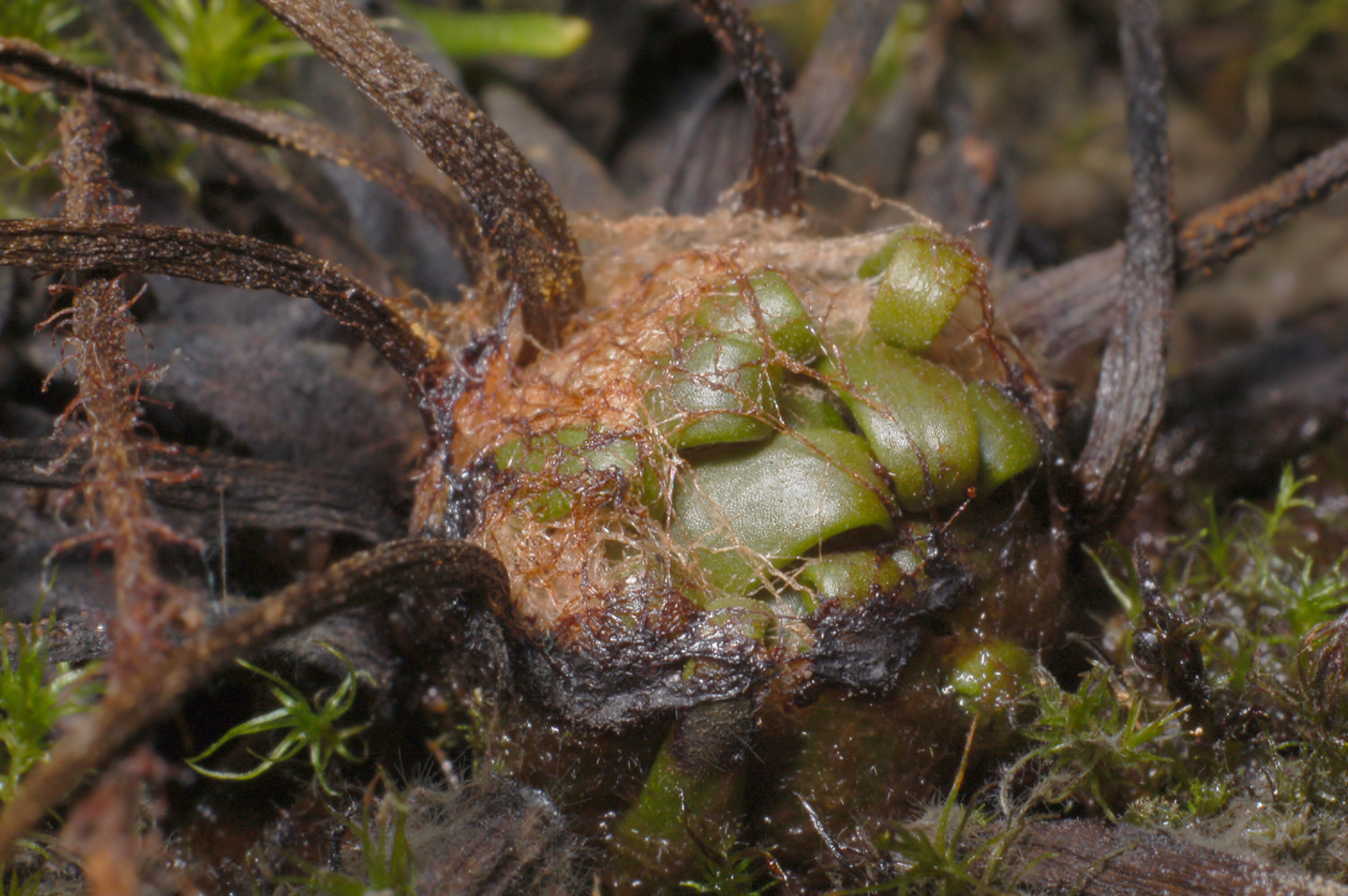
A Drosera filiformis hibernaculum

Hibernaculum (plural hibernacula) is the term often applied to a winter bud of certain aquatic plants, such as the bladderworts (Utricularia). The buds are heavier than water, and, being developed at the approach of cold weather, they become detached, sink to the bottom of the pond, and thus survive the winter. In the spring, they enlarge, developing air spaces, rise to the surface, and reproduce their species.

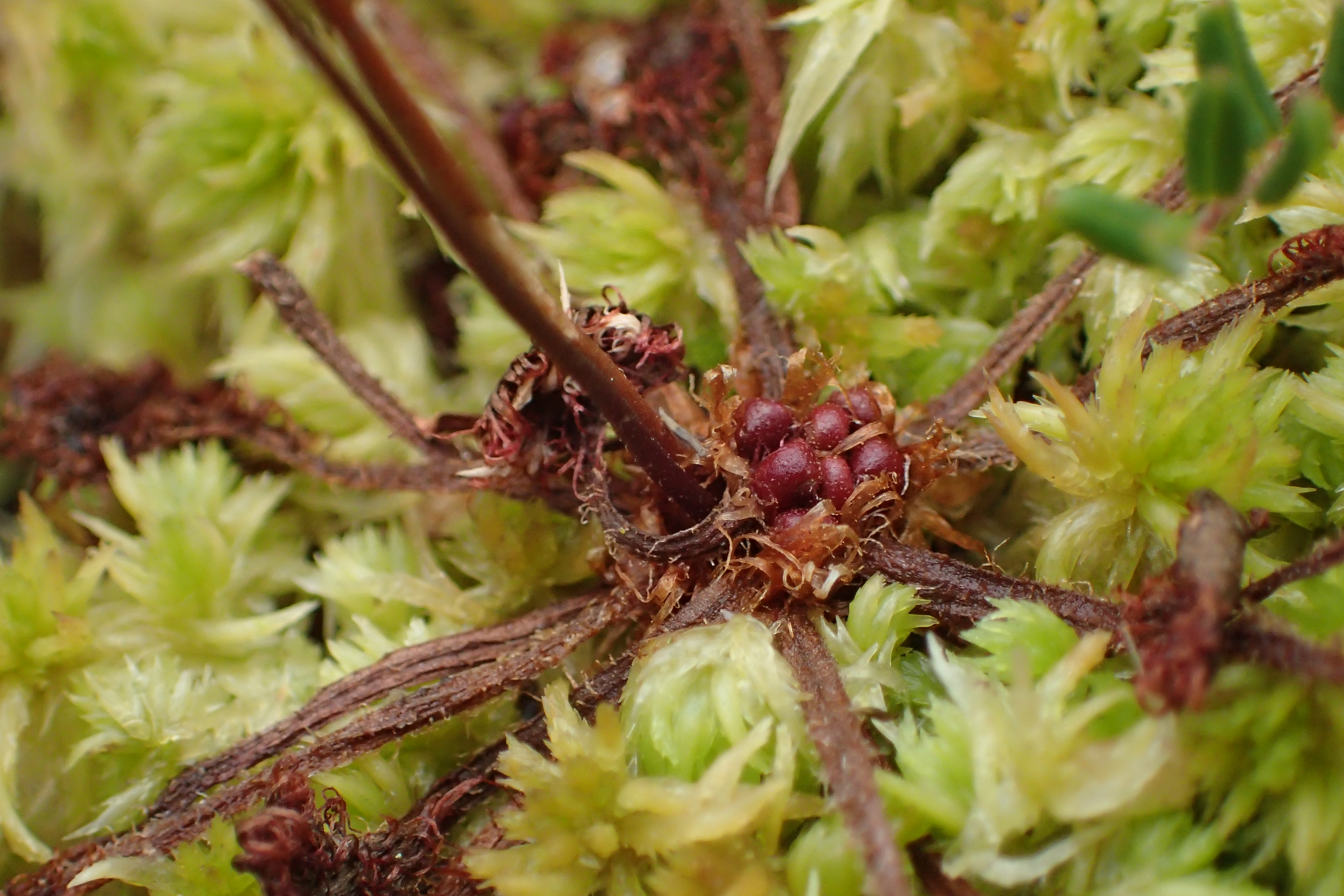
A hibernaculum of Drosera rotundifolia (with Sphagnum and cranberry)

Certain terrestrial plants also form hibernacula. These include some temperate sundews (Drosera) such as D. anglica, D. filiformis, D. intermedia, D. rotundifolia; and some temperate butterworts (Pinguicula) such as P. balcanica, P. grandiflora, P. longifolia, and P. vulgaris.

== See also ==
- Hibernaculum
- Turion (botany)
