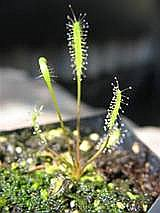

Conservation status
- Apparently Secure (NatureServe)

Scientific classification
- Kingdom: Plantae
- Clade: Tracheophytes
- Clade: Angiosperms
- Clade: Eudicots
- Order: Caryophyllales
- Family: Droseraceae
- Genus: Drosera
- Subgenus: Drosera subg. Drosera
- Section: Drosera sect. Drosera
- Species: D. linearis

Binomial name
- Drosera linearis Goldie

Synonyms
- D. longifolia var. linearis (Goldie) Spreng. ex Steud.

= Drosera linearis =

Species of carnivorous plant

Drosera linearis, commonly called the slenderleaf sundew, is a sundew found in the Great Lakes region of North America, in Canada and the United States, such as Michigan, and in Montana. It is usually no more than four inches (10 cm) tall.

== Description ==
Drosera linearis is a herbaceous perennial with gland-tipped hairs covering long linear leaves. Plants form rosettes that are 6–15 cm (2.4–5.9 in) wide. The stalks (stipules) of the leaves are 5 mm wide and hairless. The leaf blades are linear-shaped, 1–6 cm (0.39–2.36 in) long, and 1.5–3 mm wide with edges lined with hair-like glands. The flower scapes are hairless, 6 to 13 cm (2.4 to 5.1 in) long, ending in 1 to 4 white flowers. The flowers are 6–8 mm wide with obovate shaped petals. The seed capsules are 4–5 mm long and when ripe have black, oblong-obovoid to rhomboidal-shaped seeds that 0.5–0.8 mm long. The seeds are densely and irregularly pitted with craters. The diploid (2N) chromosome count is 20.

== Distribution and habitat ==
Drosera linearis range is centered around the great lakes region with scattered populations in western Canada and the maritime provinces. It is rare over most of its range, and only locally common in specific habitats. It is found in remote peat-lands in the northwestern and north central part of Minnesota; where it grows in minerotrophic water originating from groundwater or nearby uplands. Because of its rareness and its restrictive habitats, it is listed as a threatened species in Minnesota.

== See also ==
- List of Drosera species
