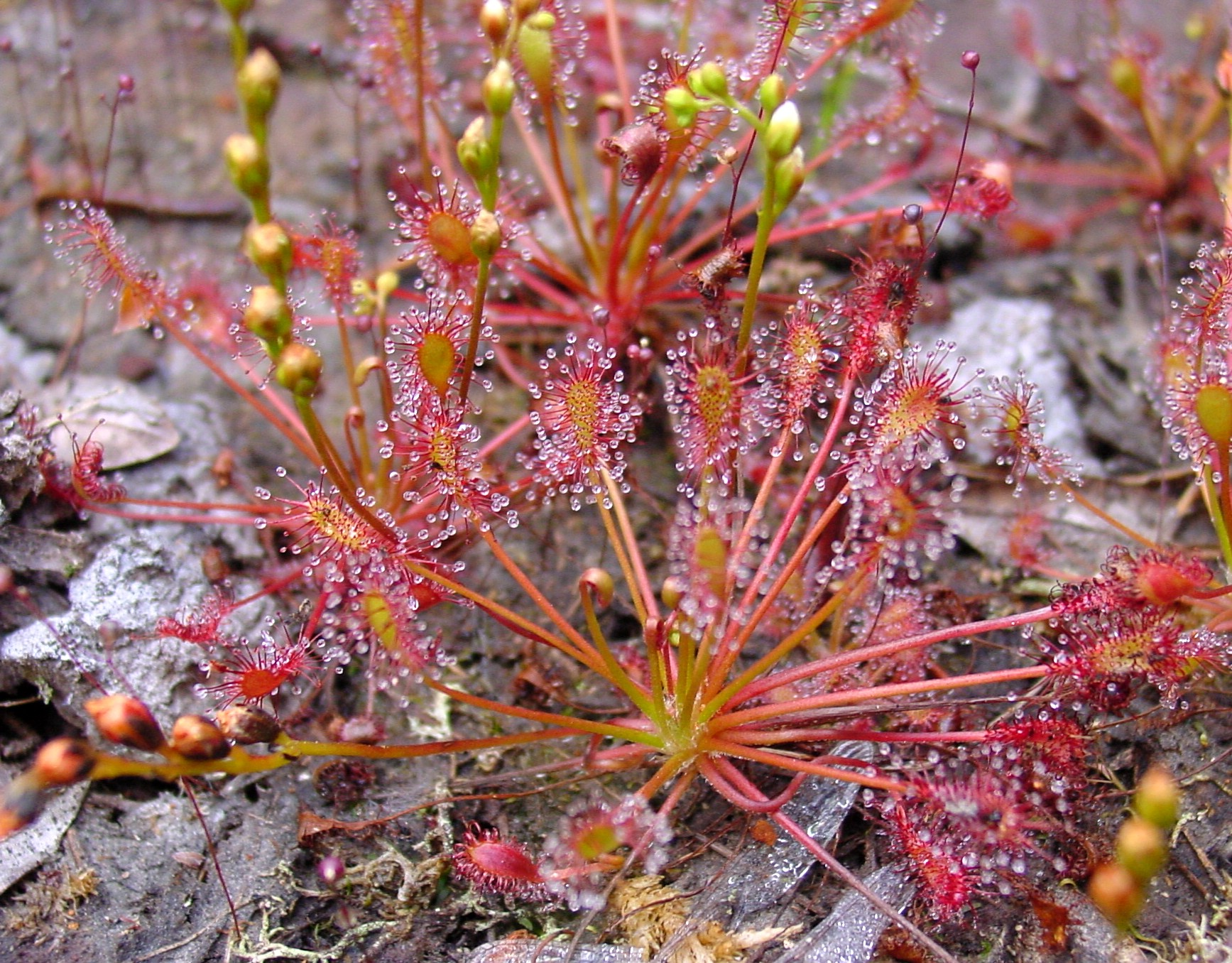

Scientific classification
- Kingdom: Plantae
- Clade: Tracheophytes
- Clade: Angiosperms
- Clade: Eudicots
- Order: Caryophyllales
- Family: Droseraceae
- Genus: Drosera
- Subgenus: Drosera subg. Drosera
- Section: Drosera sect. Drosera
- Species: D. intermedia

Binomial name
- Drosera intermedia Hayne, 1800
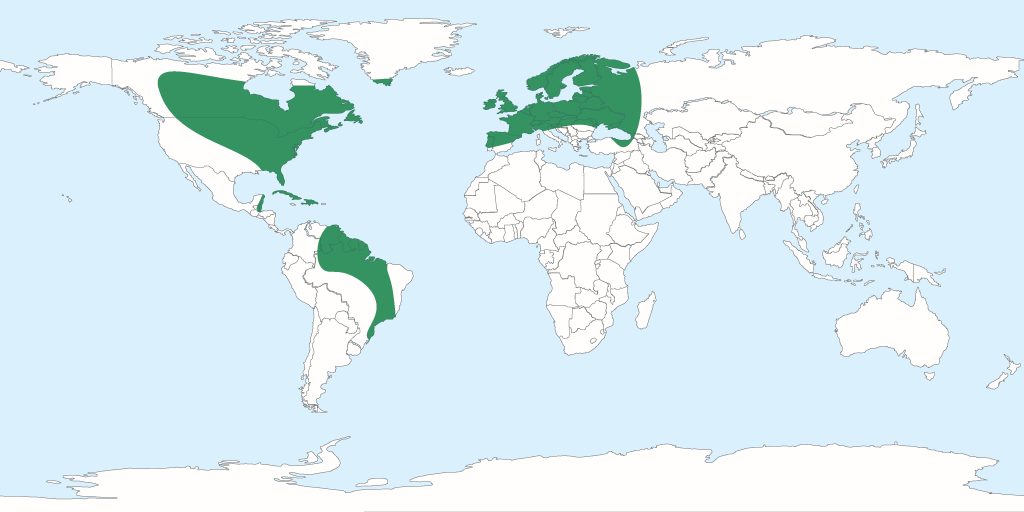
- Distribution map

= Drosera intermedia =

Species of carnivorous plant

Drosera intermedia, commonly known as the oblong-leaved sundew, spoonleaf sundew, or spatulate leaved sundew, is an insectivorous plant species belonging to the sundew genus. It is a temperate or tropical species native to Europe, southeastern Canada, the eastern half of the United States, Cuba, Hispaniola, and northern South America.

== Description ==
Drosera intermedia is a perennial herb which forms a semi-erect stemless rosette of spatulate leaves up to 10 cm tall. Plants in temperate regions undergo dormancy during which they form a winter resting bud called a hibernaculum.

As is typical for sundews, the leaf blades are densely covered with stalked mucilaginous glands which secrete a sugary nectar to attract insects. These then become ensnared by the mucilage and, unless they are strong enough to escape, are suffocated or die from exhaustion. The plant then secretes digestive enzymes from sessile glands and later absorbs the resulting nutrient solution to supplement the poor mineral nutrition of the plants natural environment.

Drosera intermedia blooms from June through August, forming up to 15 cm. tall inflorescences bearing 3–8 white flowers. Fertilized ovaries swell to form egg-shaped dehiscent seed capsules which bear numerous tiny seeds.

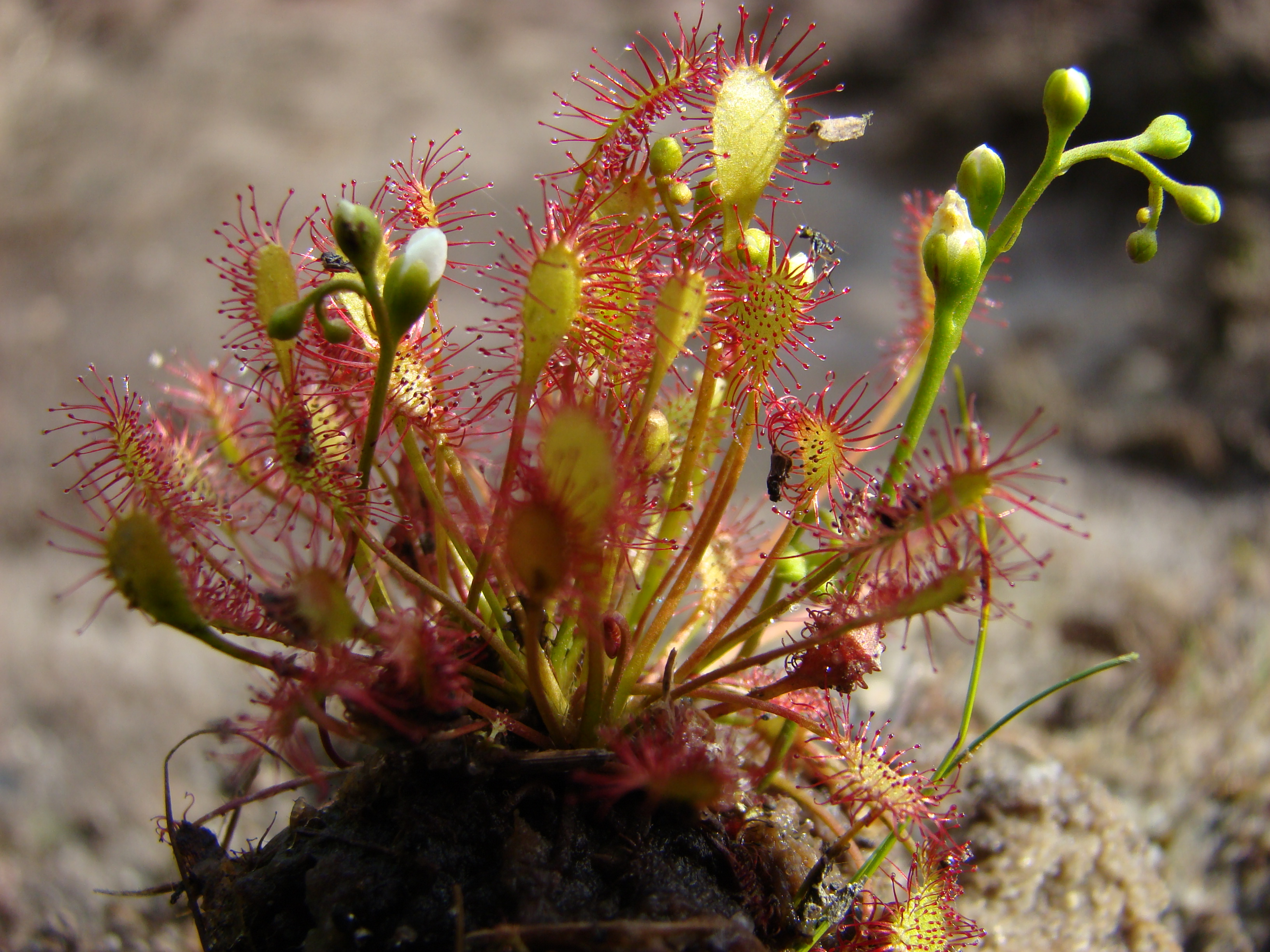

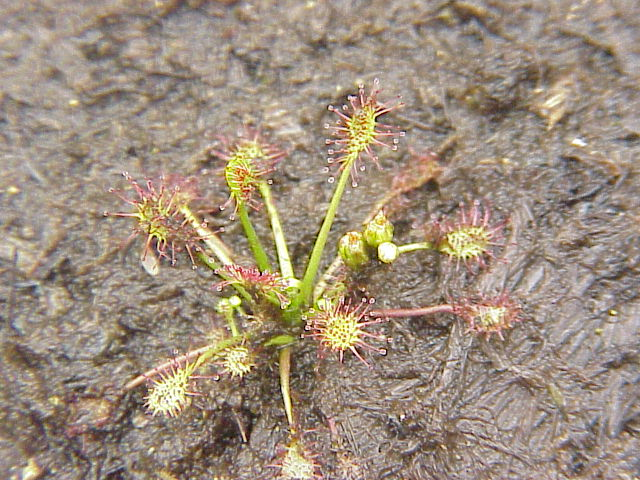

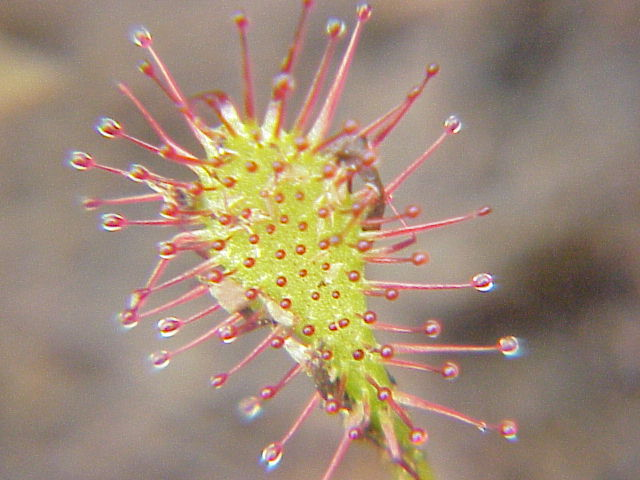
Leaf

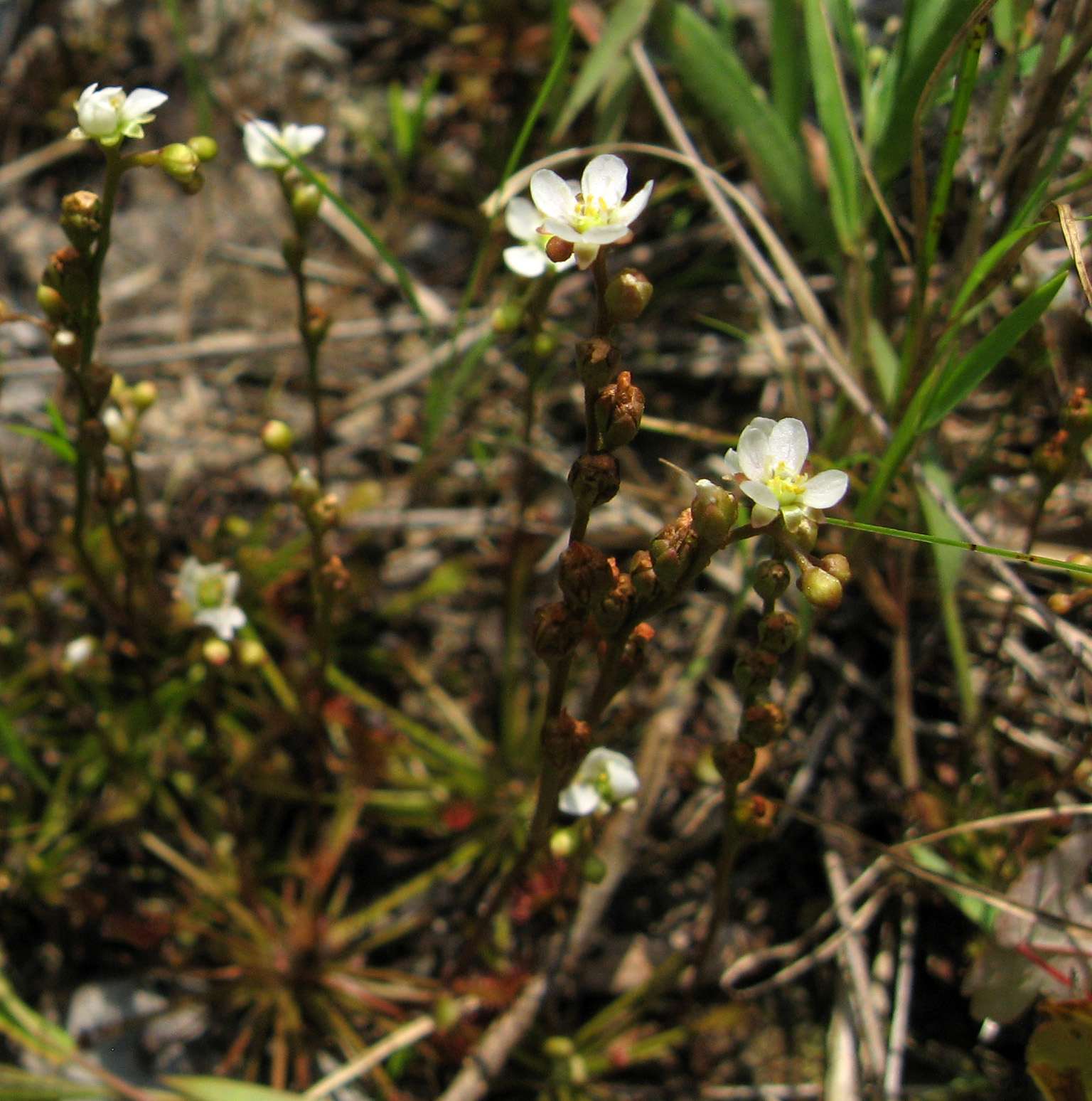
Flowers

== Distribution and habitat ==
Drosera intermedia is one of the most widely distributed species in the genus, and one of only three Drosera species native to Europe (the others are D. rotundifolia and D. anglica). It is also found in eastern North America, Cuba, and northern South America. The Cuban and South American forms are tropical and do not form hibernacula in the winter.

Drosera intermedia grows in sunny, but constantly moist habitats including bogs, fens, wet sandy shorelines and wet meadows. Since it is carnivorous, it is able to occupy relatively infertile habitats including wet sand and peat. It is a relatively weak competitor, and so is excluded from more fertile sites by competition from canopy-forming perennials. It can survive high water periods as buried seeds, and then re-establish when water levels fall.
