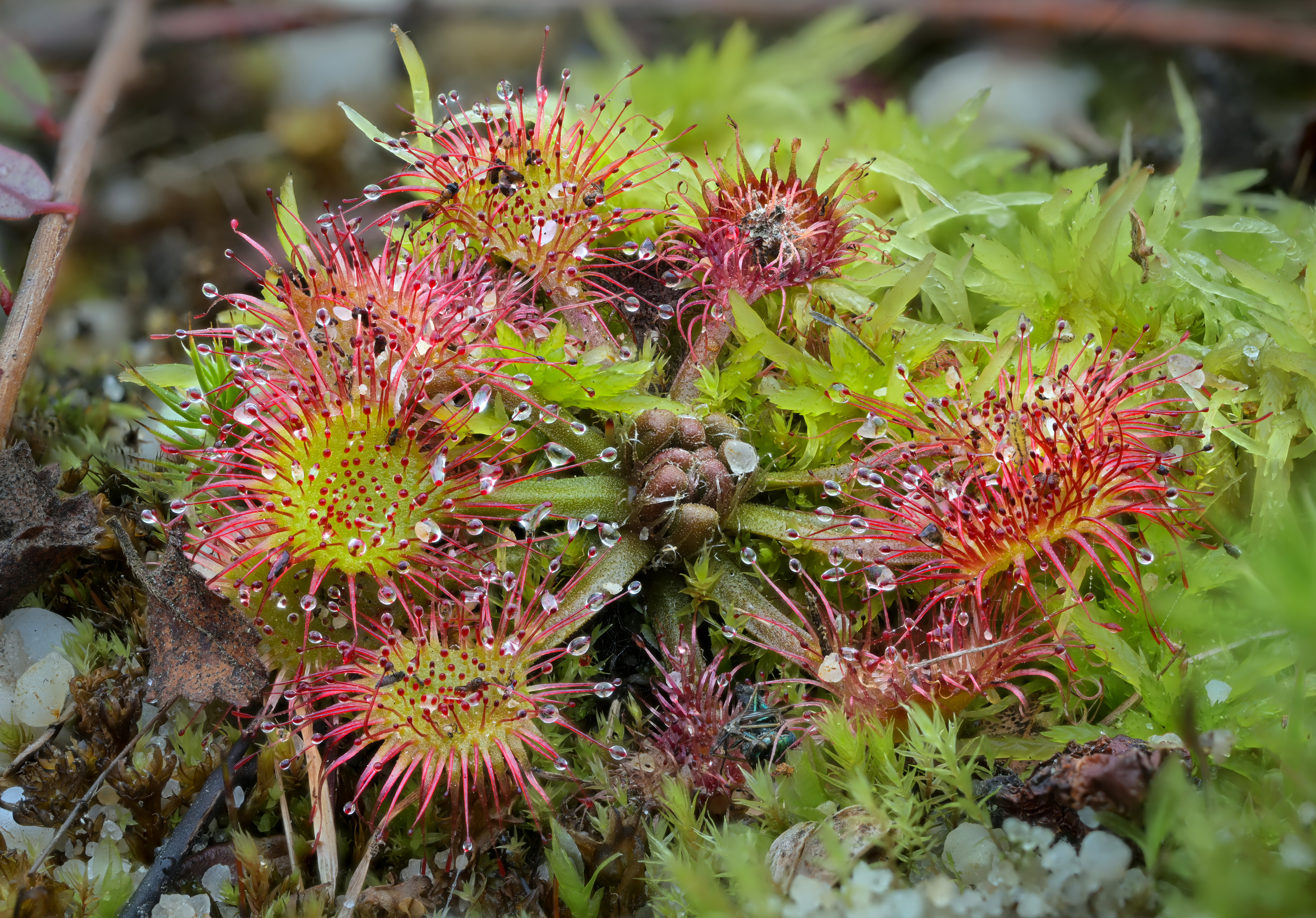

Conservation status
- Least Concern (IUCN 3.1)

- Secure (NatureServe)

Scientific classification
- Kingdom: Plantae
- Clade: Embryophytes
- Clade: Tracheophytes
- Clade: Spermatophytes
- Clade: Angiosperms
- Clade: Eudicots
- Order: Caryophyllales
- Family: Droseraceae
- Genus: Drosera
- Subgenus: Drosera subg. Drosera
- Section: Drosera sect. Drosera
- Species: D. rotundifolia

Binomial name
- Drosera rotundifolia L.

Synonyms
- Homotypic: Rorella rotundifolia (L.) All.; Rossolis rotundifolia (L.) Moench; Heterotypic: Drosera belezeana E.G.Camus; Drosera corsica (Maire) A.W.Hill; Drosera rotundifolia subsp. bracteata J.Kern & Stern; Drosera rotundifolia var. breviscapa Regel; Drosera rotundifolia f. breviscapa Domin; Drosera rotundifolia var. capillaris A.A.Eaton & Wright; Drosera rotundifolia var. caulescens Gray; Drosera rotundifolia f. comosa (Fernald) B.Boivin; Drosera rotundifolia var. comosa Fernald; Drosera rotundifolia f. corsica Maire; Drosera rotundifolia var. corsica Briq.; Drosera rotundifolia var. distachya DC.; Drosera rotundifolia var. furcata Y.Z.Ruan; Drosera rotundifolia var. furcata Westerl.; Drosera rotundifolia var. gracilis Laest. ex Hultén; Drosera rotundifolia var. longipetiolata H.Lév.; Drosera rotundifolia var. maritima Graebn.; Drosera rotundifolia var. perennis Gray; Drosera rotundifolia f. pygmaea Popov; Drosera septentrionalis (Scop.) Stokes; Rossolis septentrionalis Scop.

= Drosera rotundifolia =

Species of carnivorous flowering plant

Drosera rotundifolia, the round-leaved sundew, roundleaf sundew, or common sundew, is a species of carnivorous flowering plant that grows in bogs, marshes and fens. One of the most widespread sundew species, it has a circumboreal distribution, being found in almost all of Europe, all of Siberia, large parts of North America, Korea and Japan but is also found as far south as eastern China, the Philippines, and into the Southern Hemisphere in New Guinea.

== Description ==
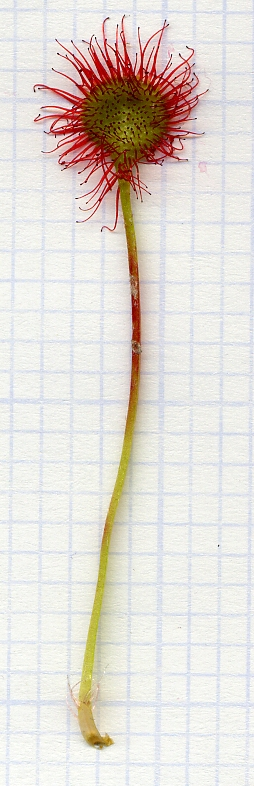
A Drosera rotundifolia leaf on a 1 mm grid

The leaves of the common sundew are arranged in a basal rosette. The narrow, hairy, 1.3-to-5.0-centimetre (0.5 to 2.0 in) long petioles support 4-to-10-millimetre (0.2 to 0.4 in) round laminae. The upper surface of the lamina is densely covered with red glandular hairs that secrete a sticky mucilage.

A typical plant has a diameter of around 3 to 5 centimetres (1.2 to 2.0 in), with a 5-to-25-centimetre (2 to 10 in) tall inflorescence. The flowers grow on one side of a single slender, hairless stalk that emanates from the centre of the leaf rosette. White or pink in colour, the five-petalled flowers produce light brown, slender, tapered seeds 1.0-to-1.5-millimetre (0.04 to 0.06 in).

In winter, D. rotundifolia produces a hibernaculum to survive cold conditions. This consists of a bud of tightly curled leaves at ground level.

== Carnivory ==
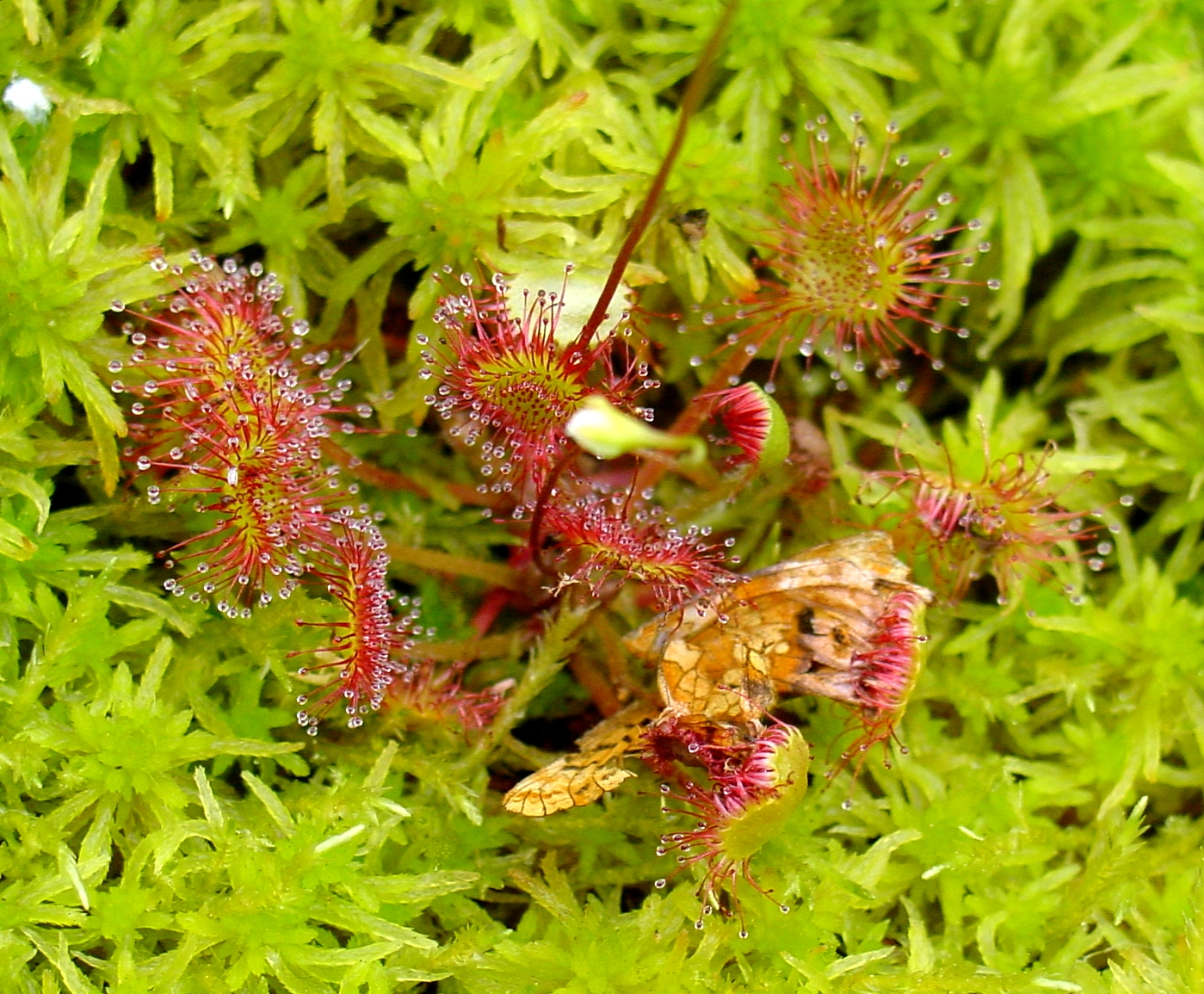
D. rotundifolia with the remains of a butterfly

The plant feeds on insects, which are attracted to the glistening drops of mucilage, loaded with a sugary substance, covering its leaves. It has evolved this carnivorous behaviour in response to its habitat, which is usually poor in nutrients or is so acidic that nutrient availability is severely decreased. The plant uses enzymes to dissolve the insects which become stuck to the glandular tentacles, and extract ammonia from proteins and other nutrients from their bodies. The ammonia replaces the nitrogen that other plants absorb from the soil, and plants that are placed in a high-nitrogen environment rely less upon nitrogen from captured insects.

It has been assumed that insects were also attracted to the bright red colour of the common sundew, but studies using artificial traps have suggested that colour does not affect prey attraction. In newly discovered climates with the plant but do not have the food associated with the requirements for growth, new studies have been conducted to determine how they are able to grow. In one study, the carnivory of Drosera rotundifolia was tested against growing conditions where the plant's insect prey was not sufficient to promote proper growth. The study tested the plant's ability to grow with limited prey but increased inorganic nutrients within the soil. The results revealed the ability of the plant to use nutrients underground instead of relying on carnivory, suggesting the plant is able to adapt according to the availability of nutrients.

== Distribution ==
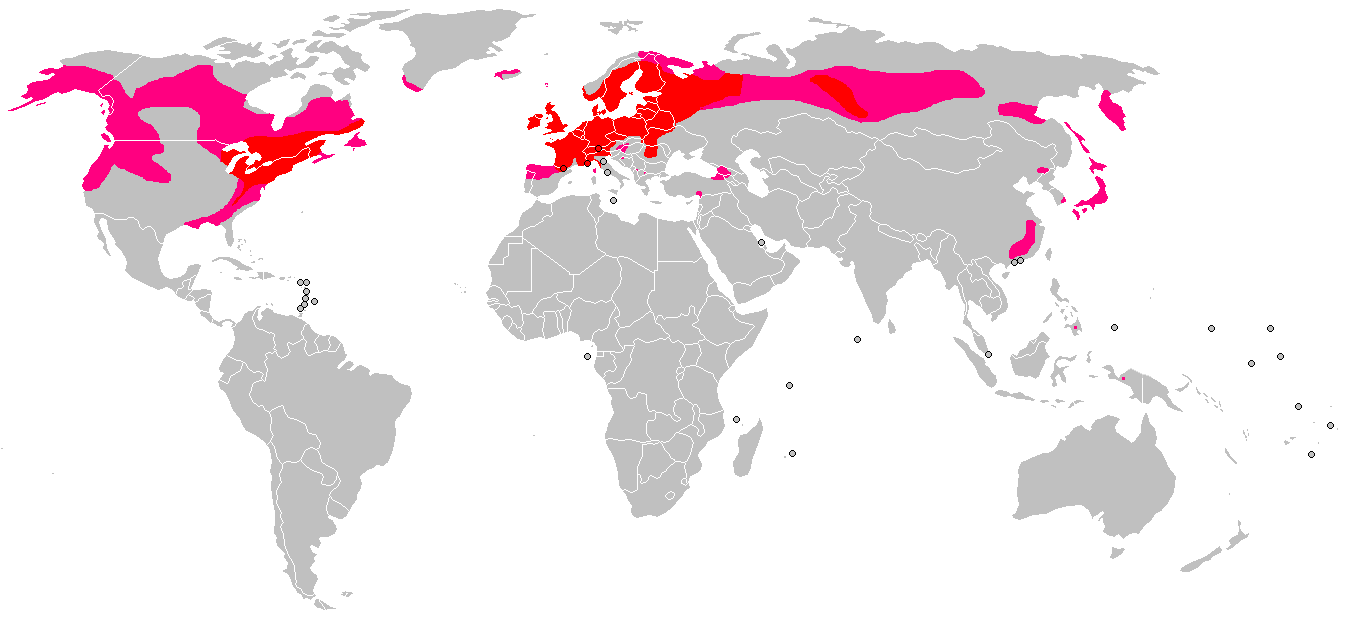
Roundleaf sundew range (red = common; pink = scattered)

In North America, the common sundew is found in all parts of Canada except the Canadian Prairies and the tundra regions, southern Alaska, the Pacific Northwest, and along the Appalachian Mountains south to Georgia and Louisiana. In the western United States, roundleaf sundew is found in mountain fens as far south as the Sierra Nevada of California and in a disjunct cluster of fen occurrences in the Rocky Mountains of Colorado. In the eastern United States, the sundew plant is found in parts stretching from Nova Scotia down the coast into Georgia. In addition to Georgia, plants are now being seen in Alabama and Mississippi. West of the Mississippi River, plants are located along the Pacific coast from Alaska down the coast to California, with new plants detected in Iowa, Minnesota and in two recently recorded sites in Gunnison County, Colorado and Bottineau County, North Dakota.

It is found in much of Europe, including the British Isles, most of France, the Benelux nations, Germany, Denmark, Switzerland, Czech Republic, Poland, Belarus, the Baltic countries, Sweden and Finland, as well as northern portions of Italy, Portugal, Spain, Romania, mountain regions of Bulgaria and in Iceland and southern regions of Norway and Greenland. It is infrequent in Austria and Hungary, and some populations are scattered around the Balkans.

In Britain, this is the most common sundew species, found widely in the west and north, from Exmoor, Dartmoor, Sedgemoor, the Lake District, Shropshire, Pennines and throughout Scotland; conversely it is rare and scattered in the Midlands and eastern England. It is usually found in bogs, marshes and in hollows or corries on the sides of mountains. It is the county flower of Shropshire. It is also common in Ireland.

In Asia, it is found across Siberia and Japan, as well as parts of Turkey, the Caucasus region, the Kamchatka Peninsula, southern parts of Korea, and northeastern and eastern China. Populations can also be found on the islands of New Guinea and Mindanao.

== Habitat ==
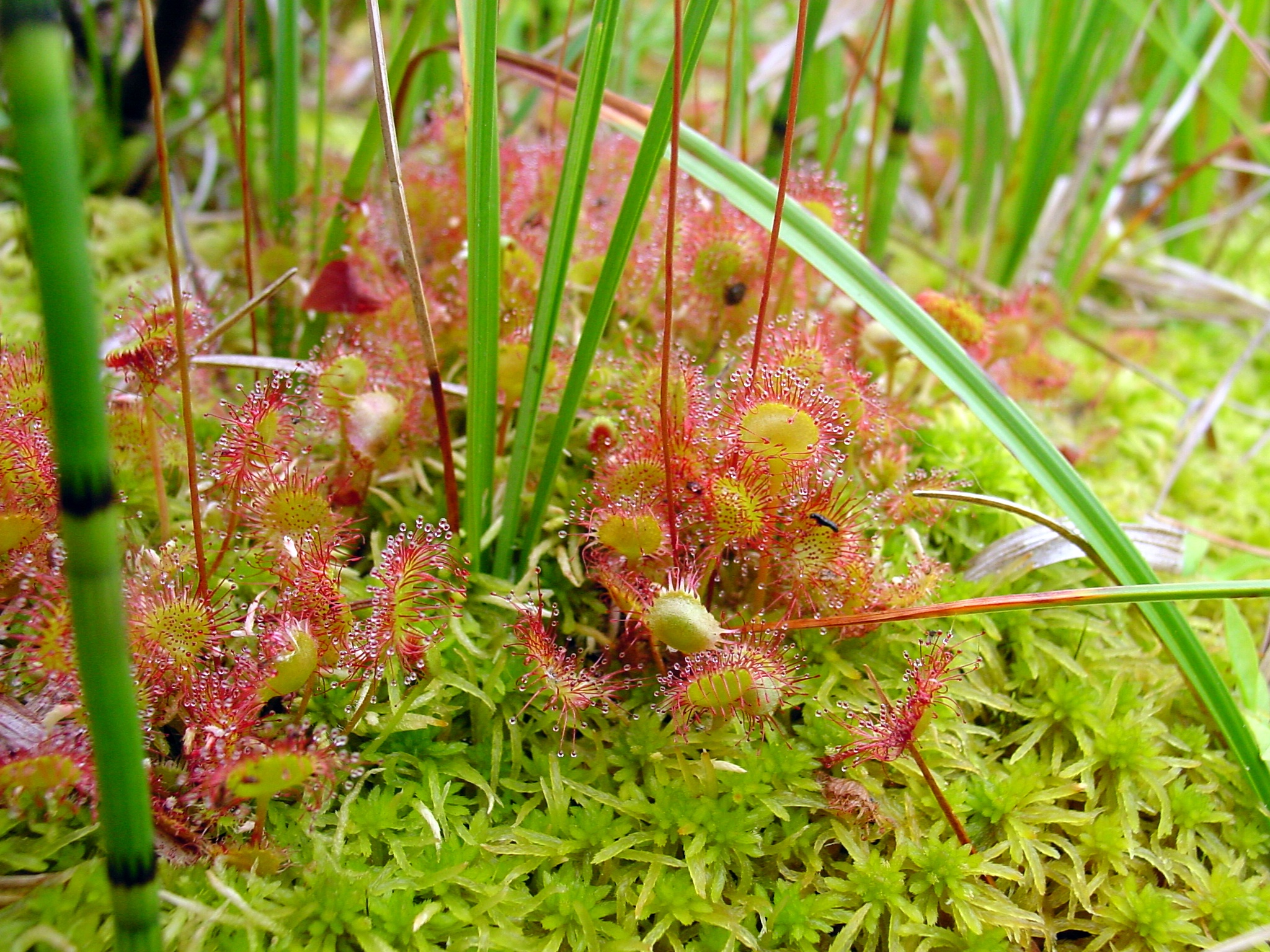
D. rotundifolia growing in sphagnum moss along with sedges and Equisetum

The common sundew thrives in wetlands such as marshes and fens. It is also found in wet stands of black spruce, Sphagnum bogs, silty and boggy shorelines and wet sands. It prefers open, sunny or partly sunny habitats.

== Conservation ==
The round-leaved sundew is classified as Least Concern in the IUCN red list. In North America, it is considered endangered in the US states of Illinois and Iowa, exploitably vulnerable in New York, and threatened in Tennessee. The species is ranked S2, imperiled, in the state of Colorado.

== Cultivation ==
D. rotundifolia is one of the temperate species of Drosera cultivated by growers interested in carnivorous plants. To be grown successfully, plants of the wild species must be given a substantial period of winter dormancy during which they form hibernacula. The cultivar D. rotundifolia 'Charles Darwin' can be grown more successfully without a period of dormancy.

== Medicinal properties ==
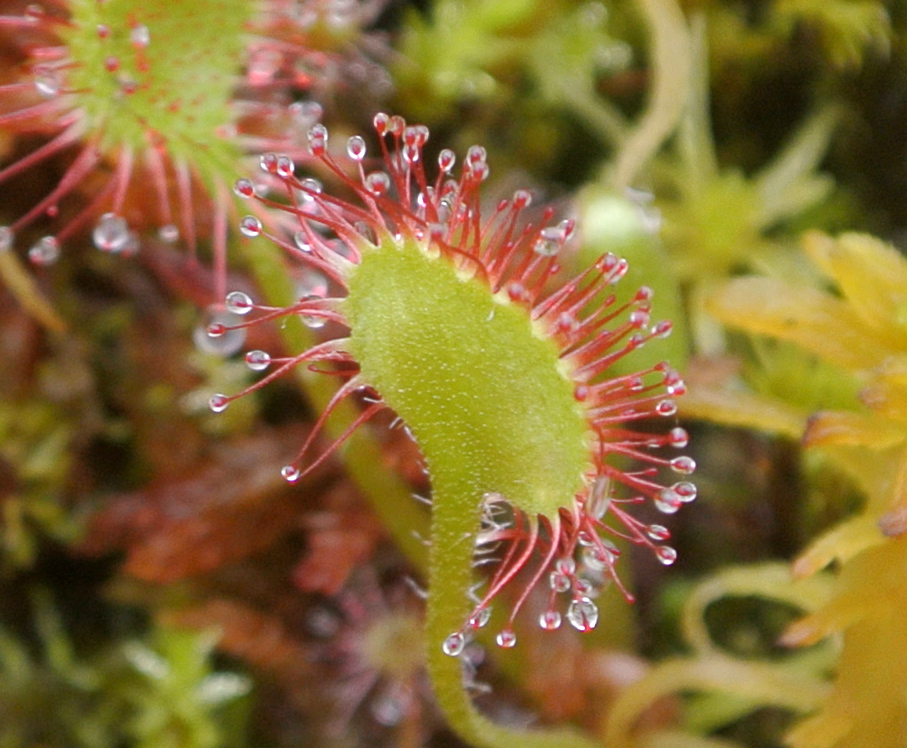
Drosera rotundifolia at Brown's Lake Bog, Ohio.

According to D.H. Paper, et al., Drosera rotundifolia plant extracts show great efficacy as an anti-inflammatory and antispasmodic, more so than D. madagascariensis, as a result of the flavonoids such as hyperoside, quercetin and isoquercetin, but not the naphthoquinones present in the extracts. The flavonoids are thought to affect the M_{3} muscarinic receptors in smooth muscle, causing the antispasmodic effects. Ellagic acid in D. rotundifolia extracts has also been shown to have antiangiogenic effects.

== Gallery ==
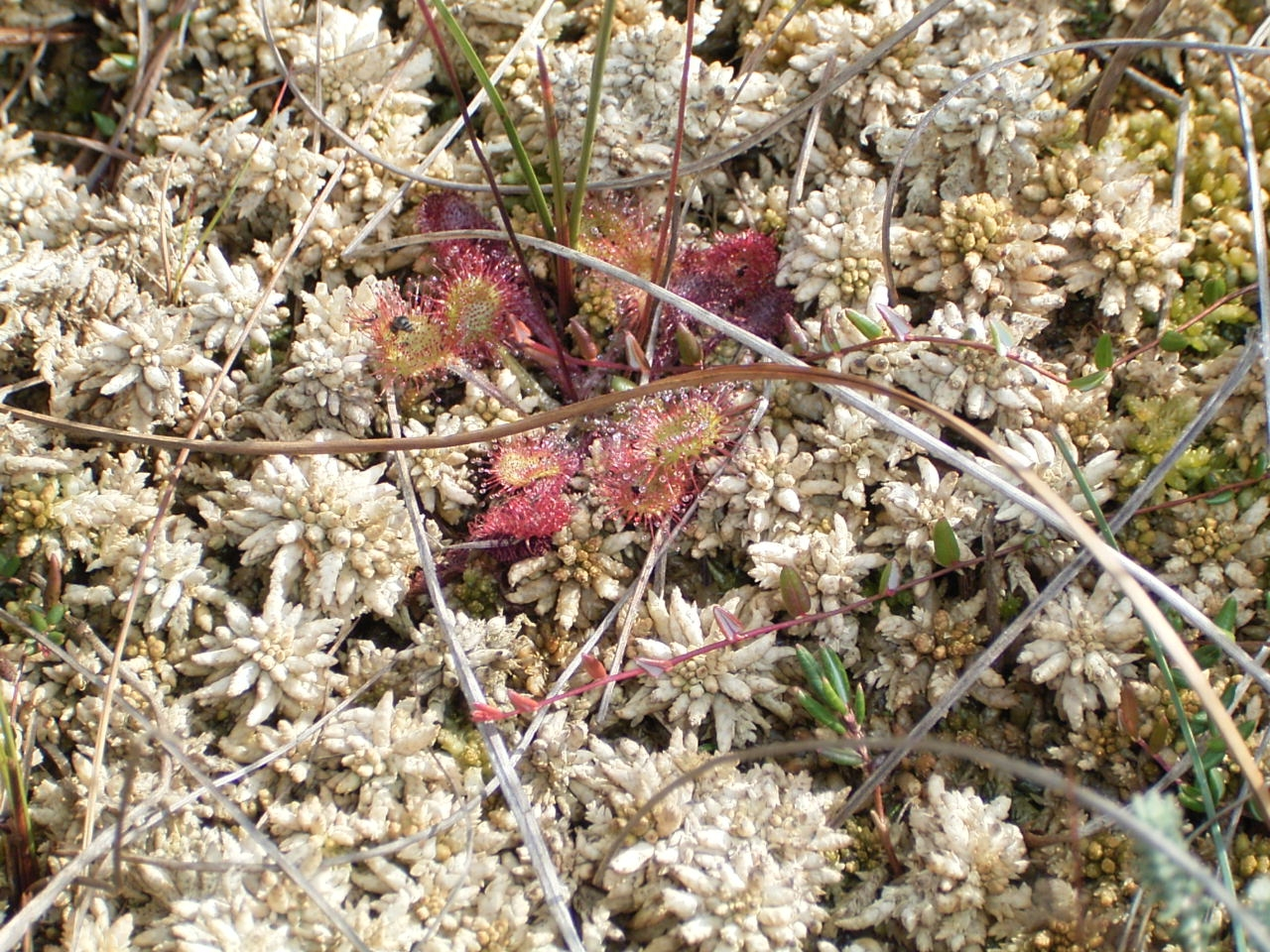
Drosera rotundifolia in a peat moss cushion

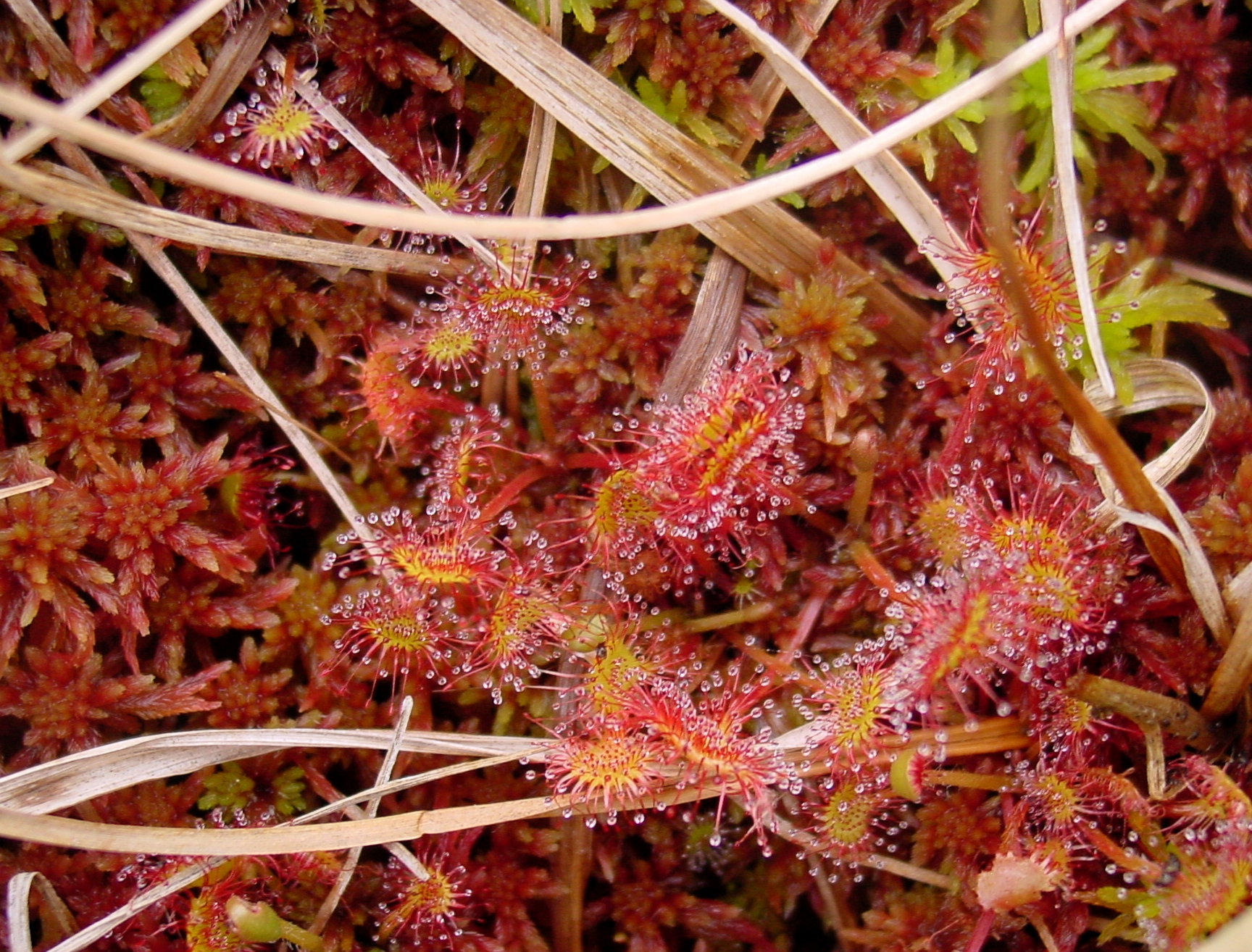
Growing in red sphagnum

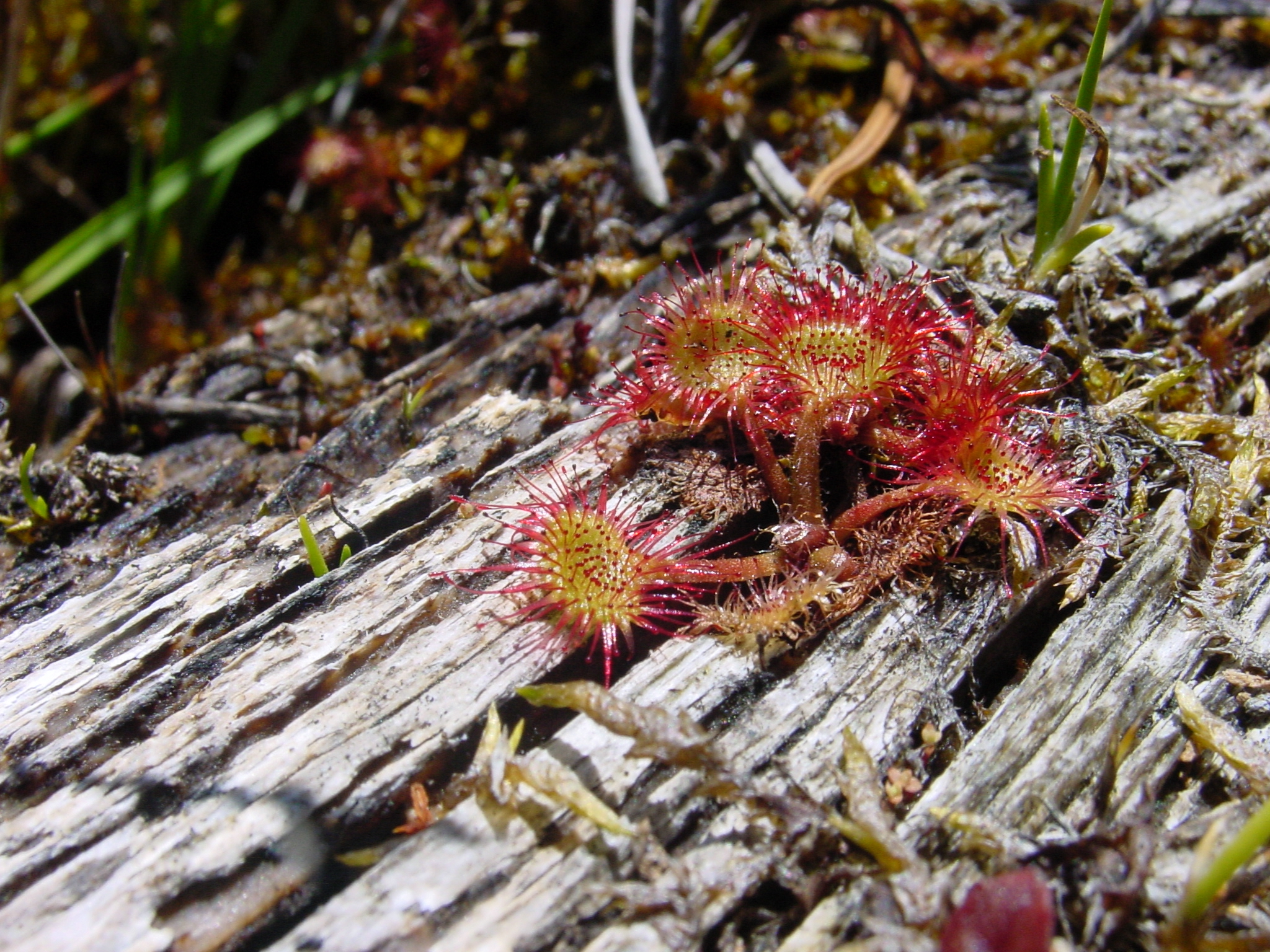
Growing in a rotting log in Oregon

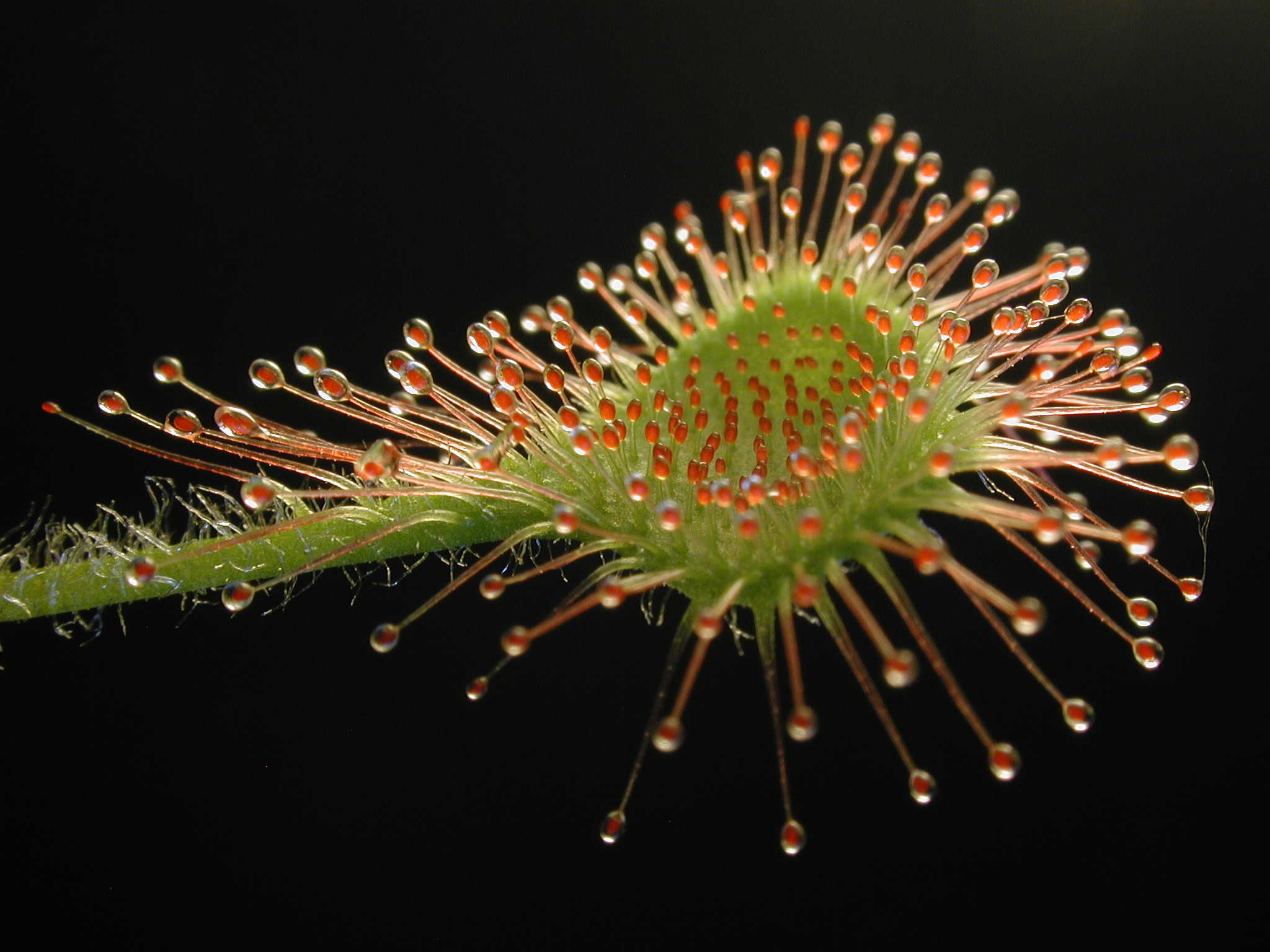
Detail of the leaf

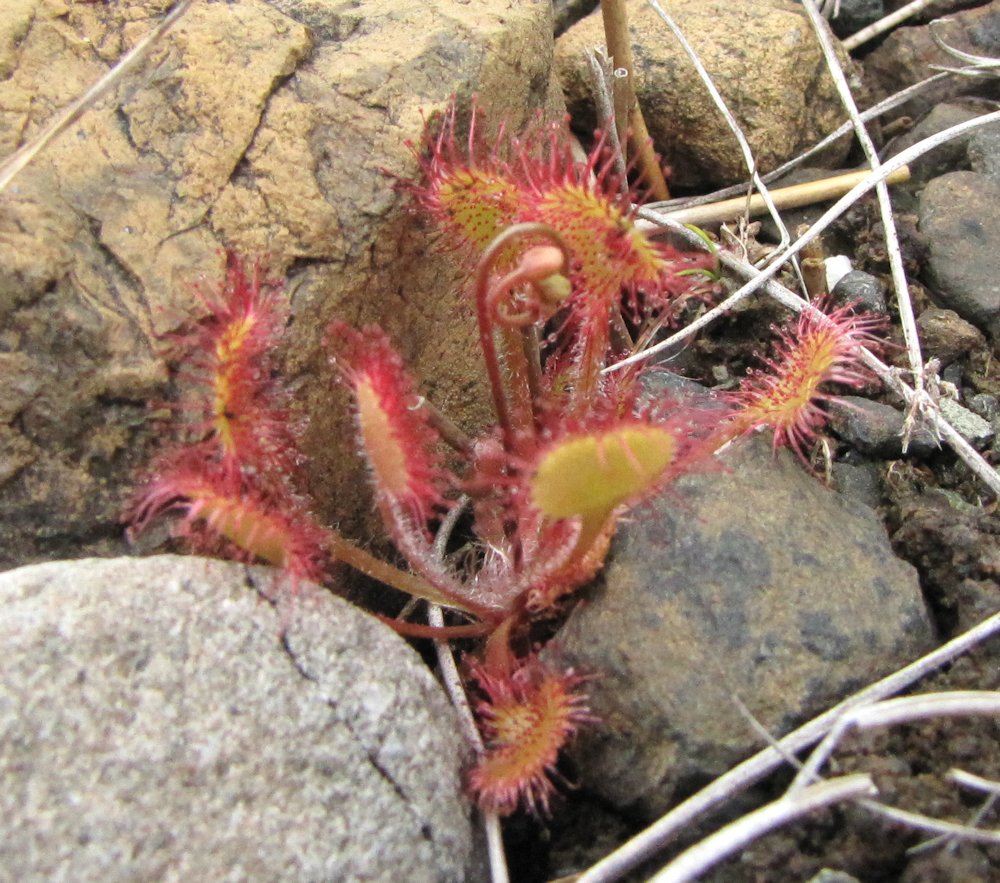
In unusual ground, Tablelands, Gros Morne National Park, Newfoundland and Labrador

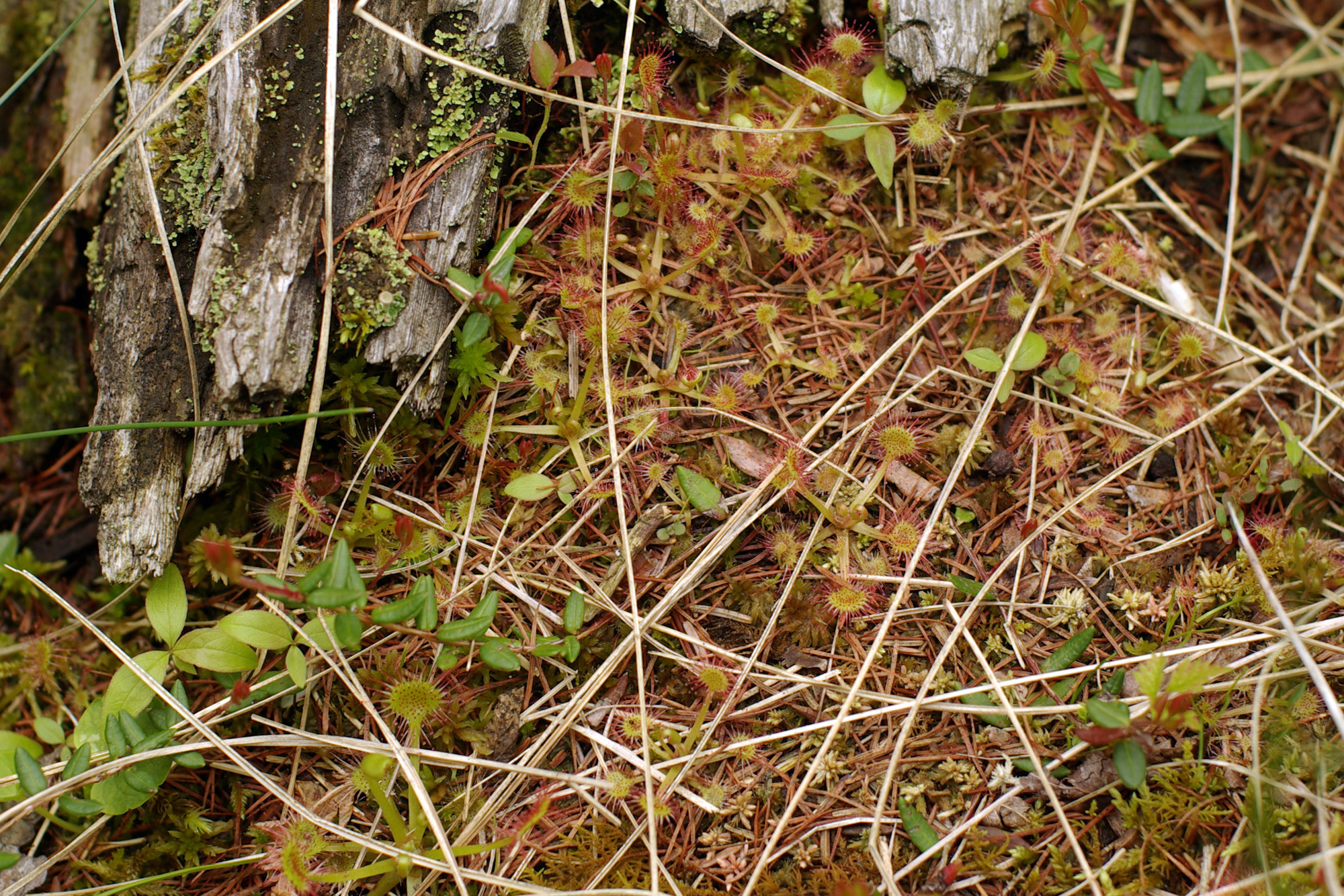
D. rotundifolia from the bog at Lake Bemidji State Park

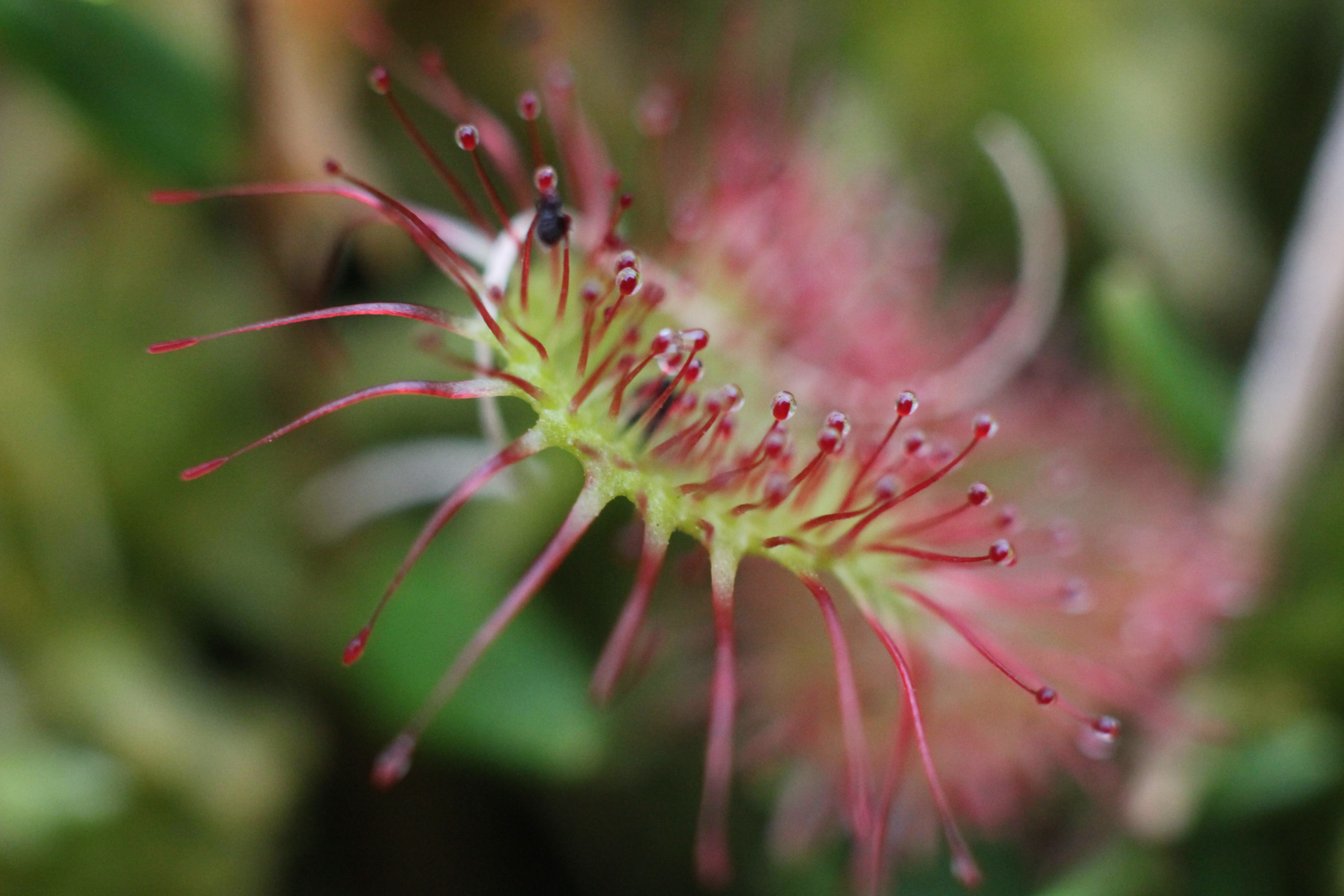
Details of the leaf

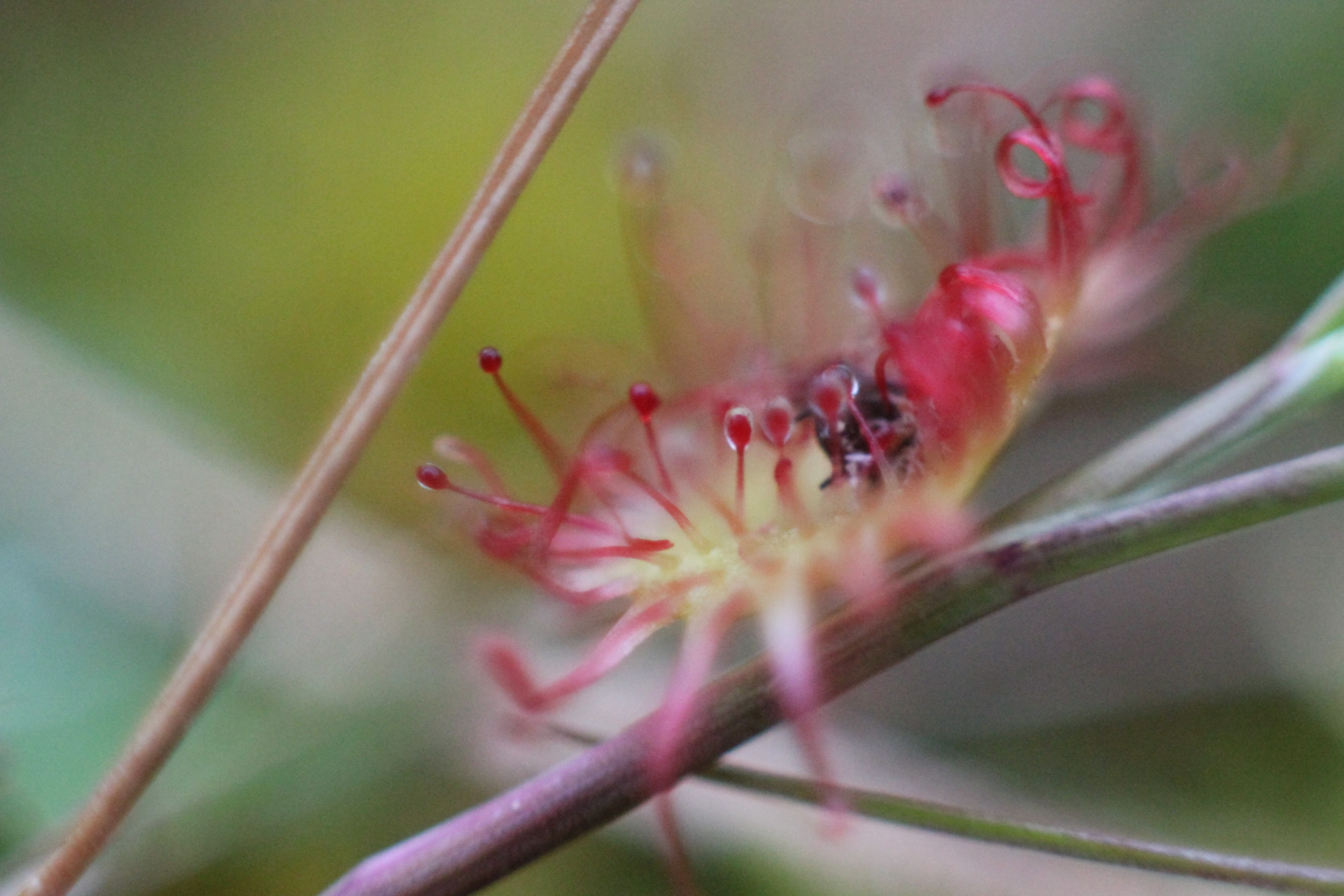
Drosera rotundifolia with an insect

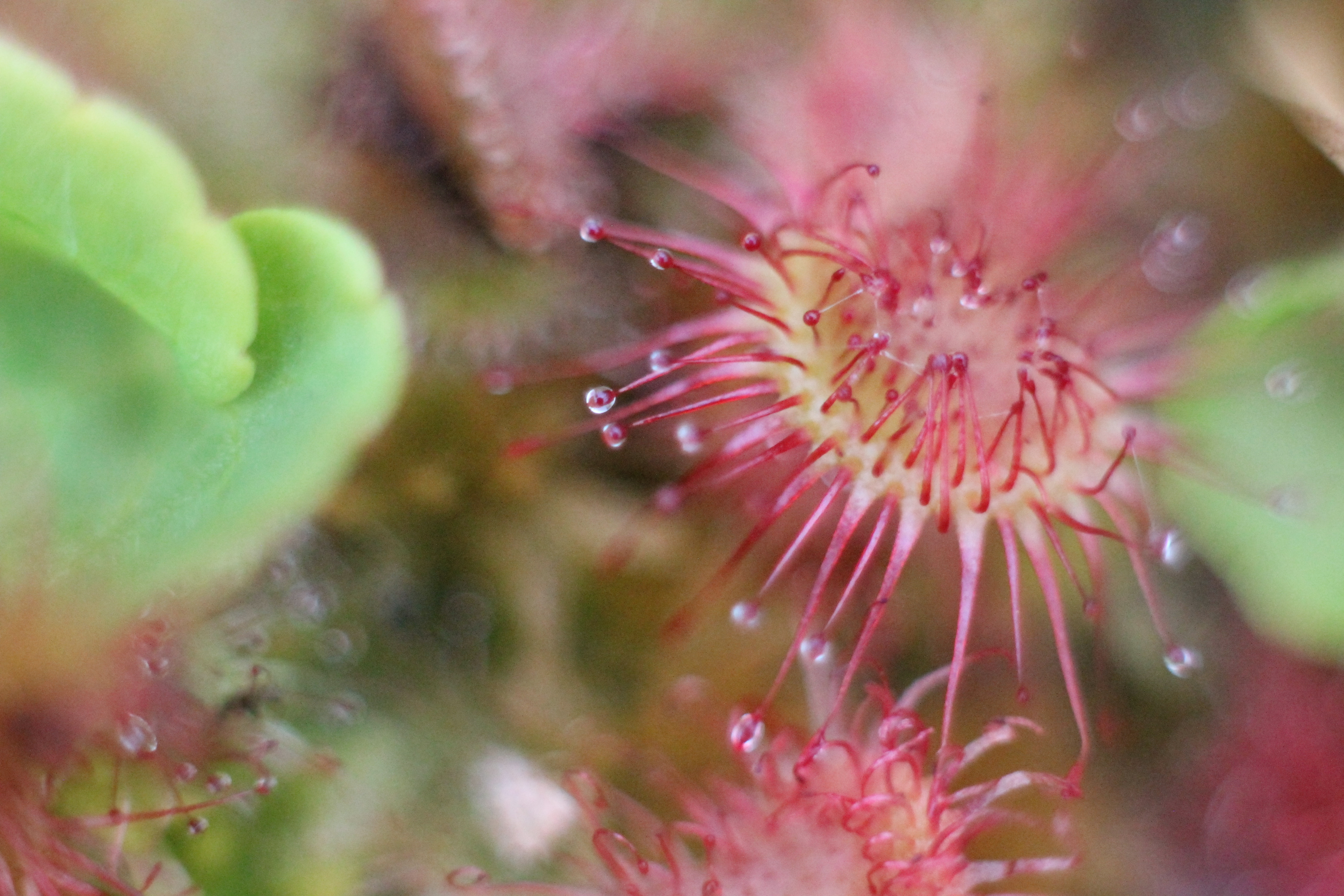
Drosera rotundifolia from a bog in Lithuania
