= Carnivorous plants of North America =

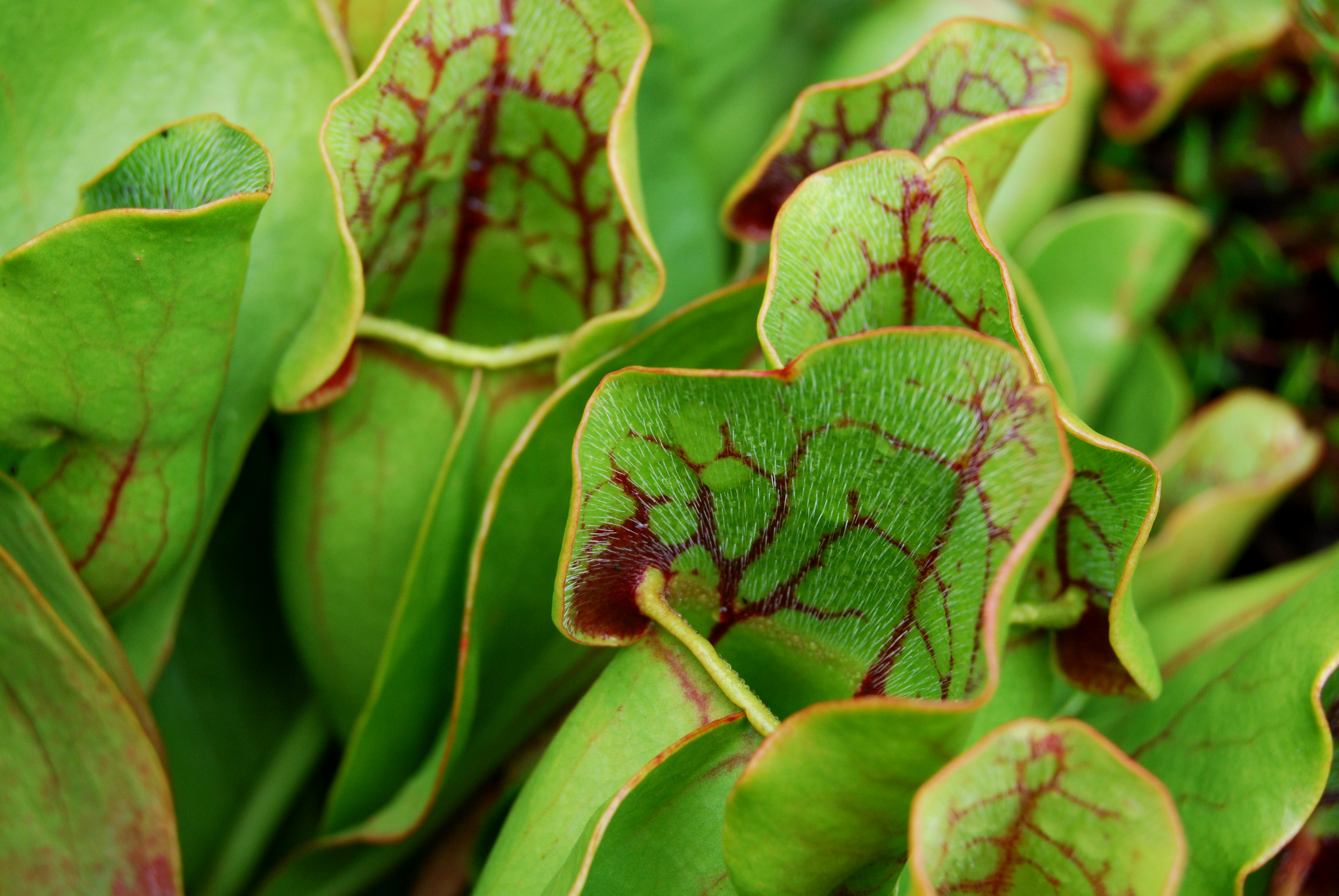
Sarracenia purpurea, a low-growing pitcher plant species native to North America

The North American continent is home to a wide variety of carnivorous plant species. Species from seven genera are native to the continent, and three of these genera are found nowhere else on the planet.

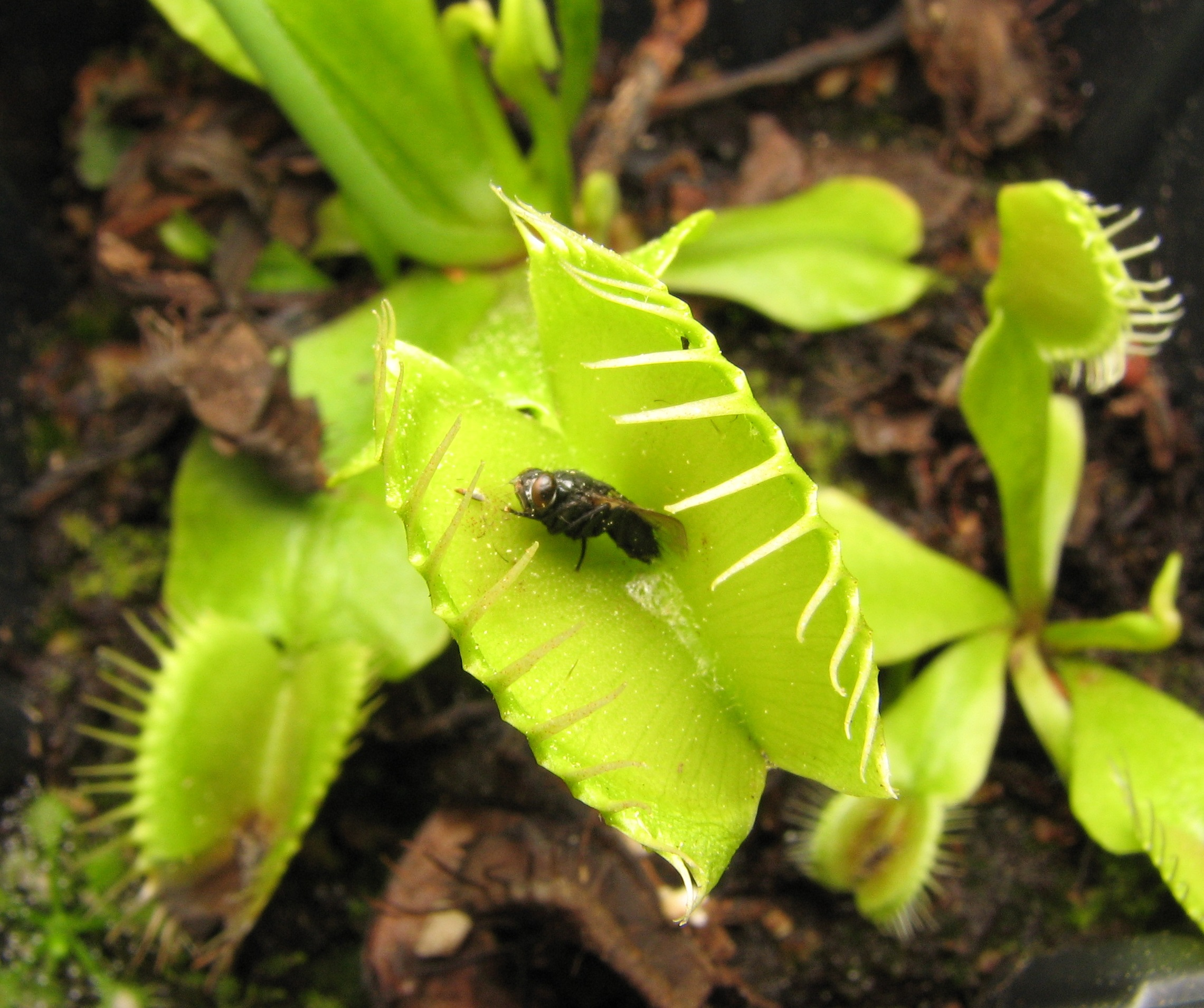
Fly trapped by Dionaea muscipula

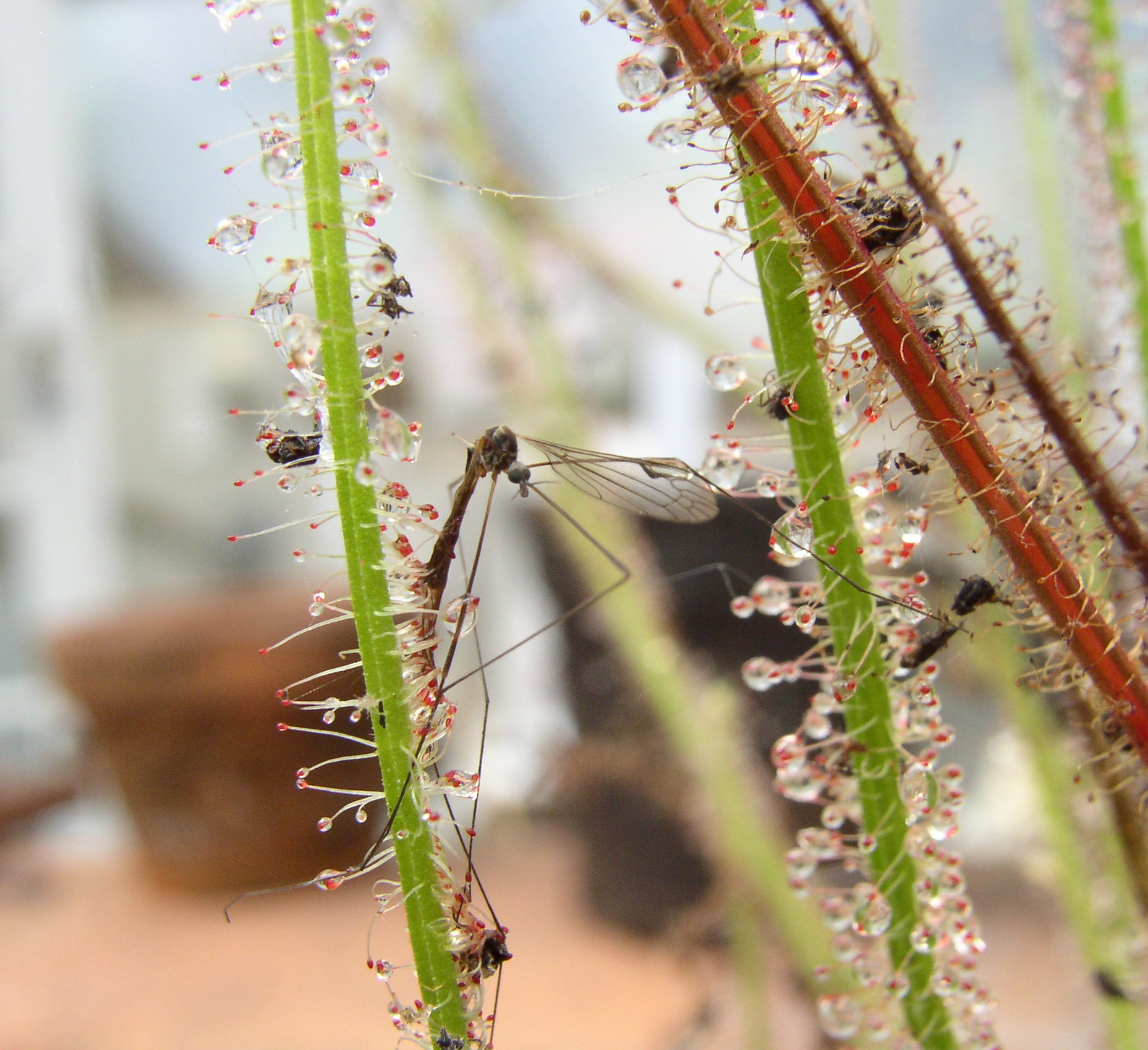
Limonia fly trapped by Drosera filiformis

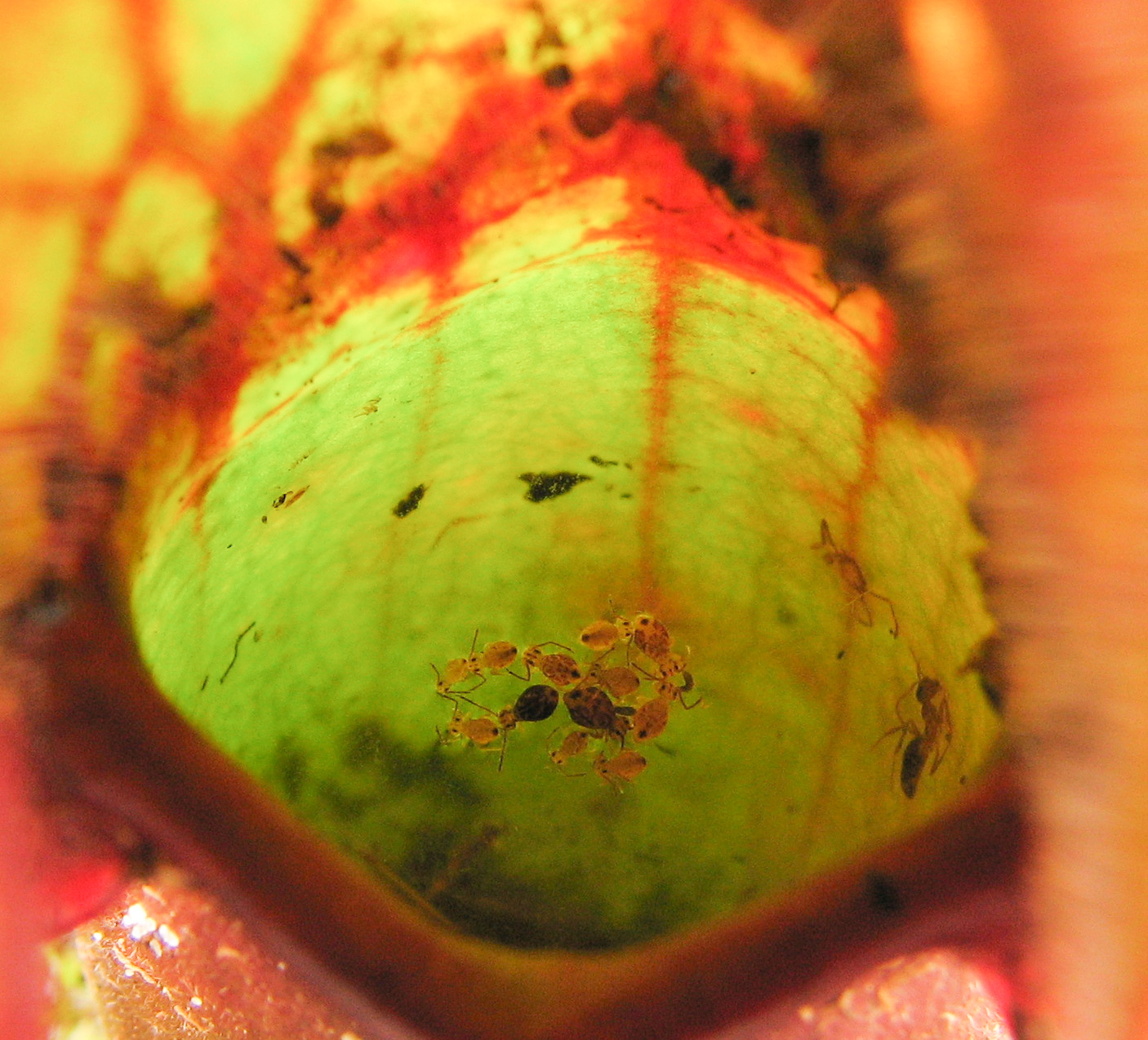
Collembola (Dicyrtomina minuta) trapped inside a leaf of Sarracenia purpurea

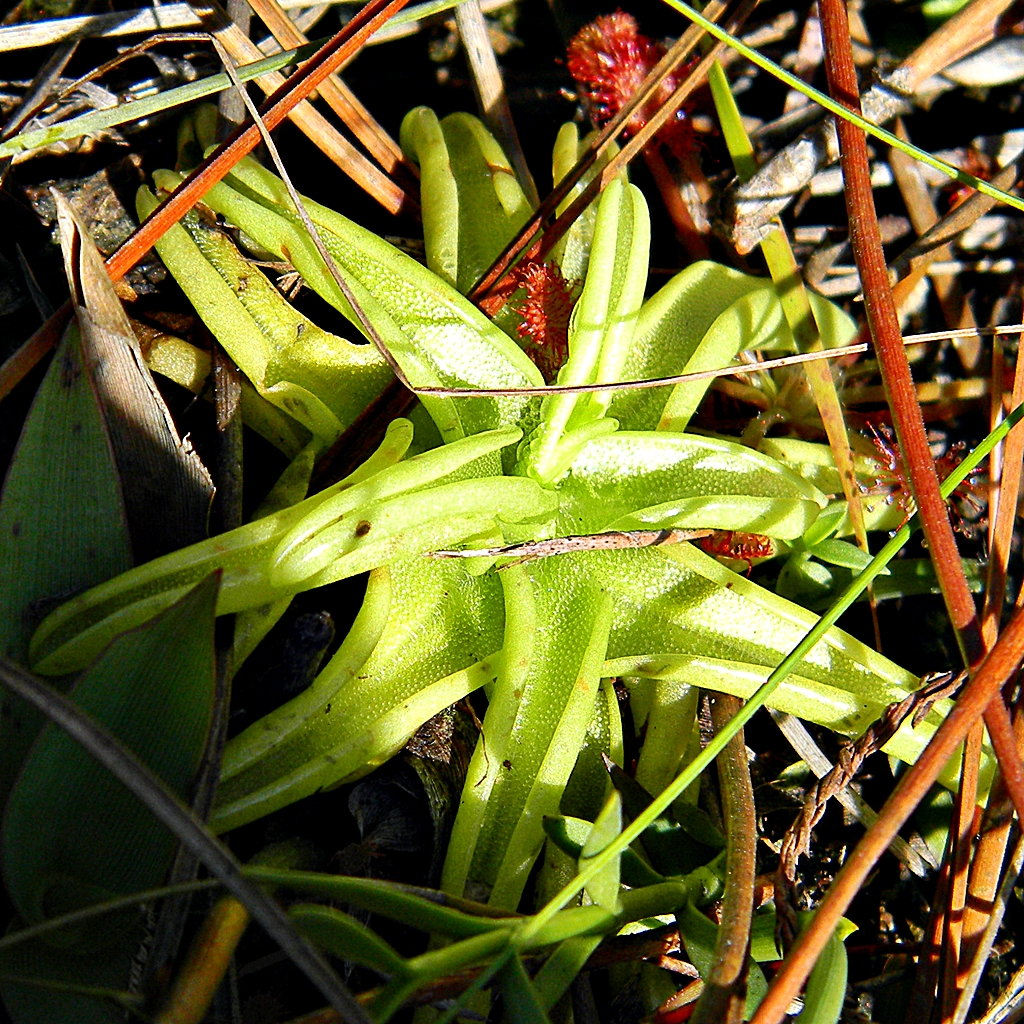
Pinguicula caerulea

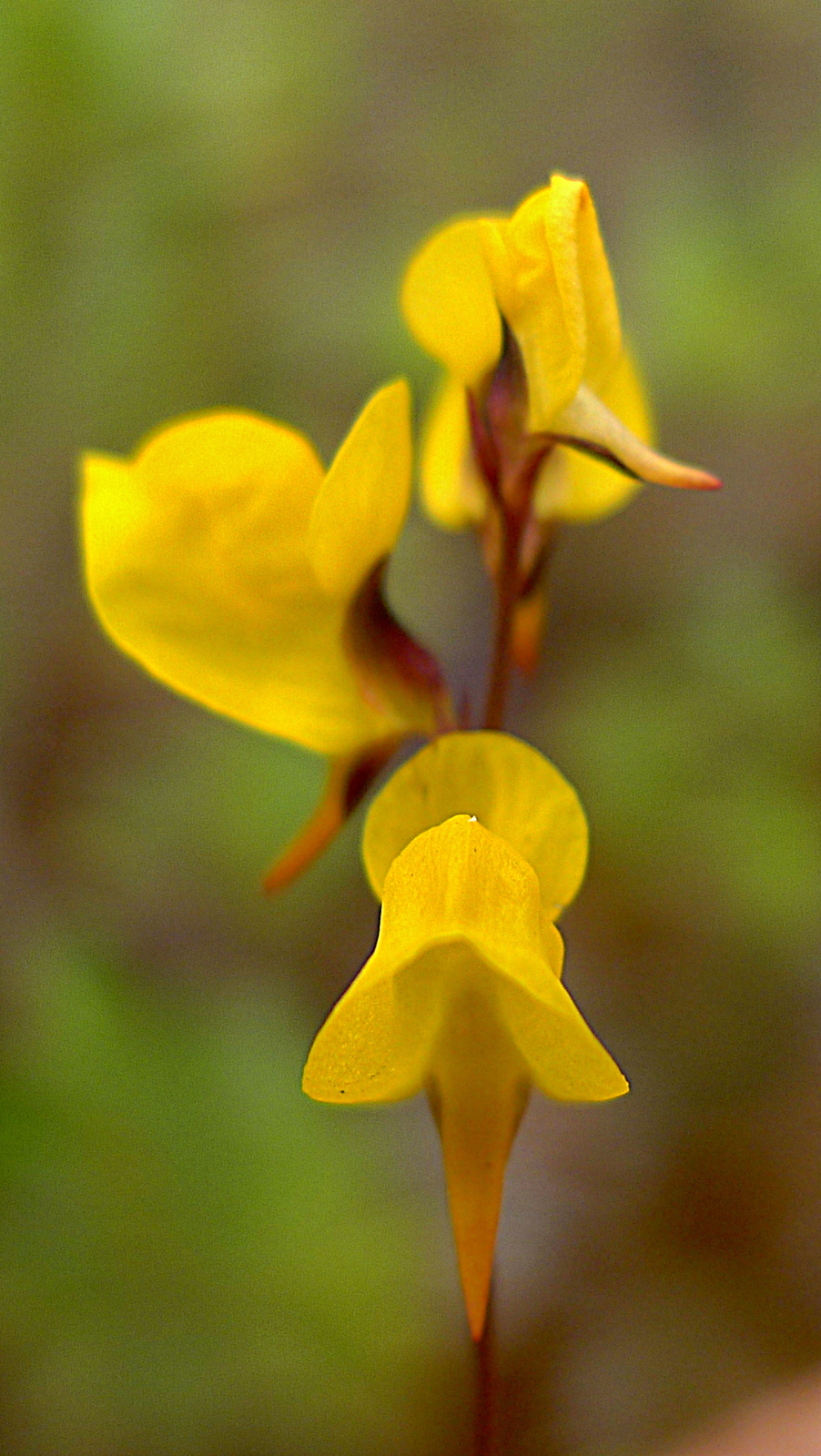
Utricularia juncea

== Genera and species ==
Catopsis

- Catopsis berteroniana

Darlingtonia

- Darlingtonia californica

Dionaea

- Dionaea muscipula

Drosera

- Drosera anglica
- Drosera brevifolia
- Drosera capillaris
- Drosera filiformis
- Drosera intermedia
- Drosera linearis
- Drosera rotundifolia
- Drosera tracyi

Sarracenia

- Sarracenia alabamensis
- Sarracenia alata
- Sarracenia flava
- Sarracenia jonesii
- Sarracenia leucophylla
- Sarracenia minor
- Sarracenia oreophila
- Sarracenia psittacina
- Sarracenia purpurea
- Sarracenia rosea
- Sarracenia rubra

Pinguicula

- Pinguicula acuminata
- Pinguicula conzattii
- Pinguicula elizabethiae
- Pinguicula filifolia
- Pinguicula gigantea
- Pinguicula gypsicola
- Pinguicula ionantha
- Pinguicula laxifolia
- Pinguicula lippoldii
- Pinguicula lithophytica
- Pinguicula lutea
- Pinguicula moranensis
- Pinguicula orchidioides
- Pinguicula primuliflora
- Pinguicula toldensis
- Pinguicula vulgaris

Utricularia

- Utricularia amethystina
- Utricularia breviscapa
- Utricularia cornuta
- Utricularia floridana
- Utricularia foliosa
- Utricularia geminiscapa
- Utricularia gibba
- Utricularia hintonii
- Utricularia hispida
- Utricularia hydrocarpa
- Utricularia inflata
- Utricularia intermedia
- Utricularia juncea
- Utricularia macrorhiza
- Utricularia minor
- Utricularia ochroleuca
- Utricularia olivacea
- Utricularia perversa
- Utricularia petersoniae
- Utricularia purpurea
- Utricularia pusilla
- Utricularia radiata
- Utricularia regia
- Utricularia resupinata
- Utricularia simulans
- Utricularia striata
- Utricularia stygia
- Utricularia subulata
- Utricularia vulgaris
