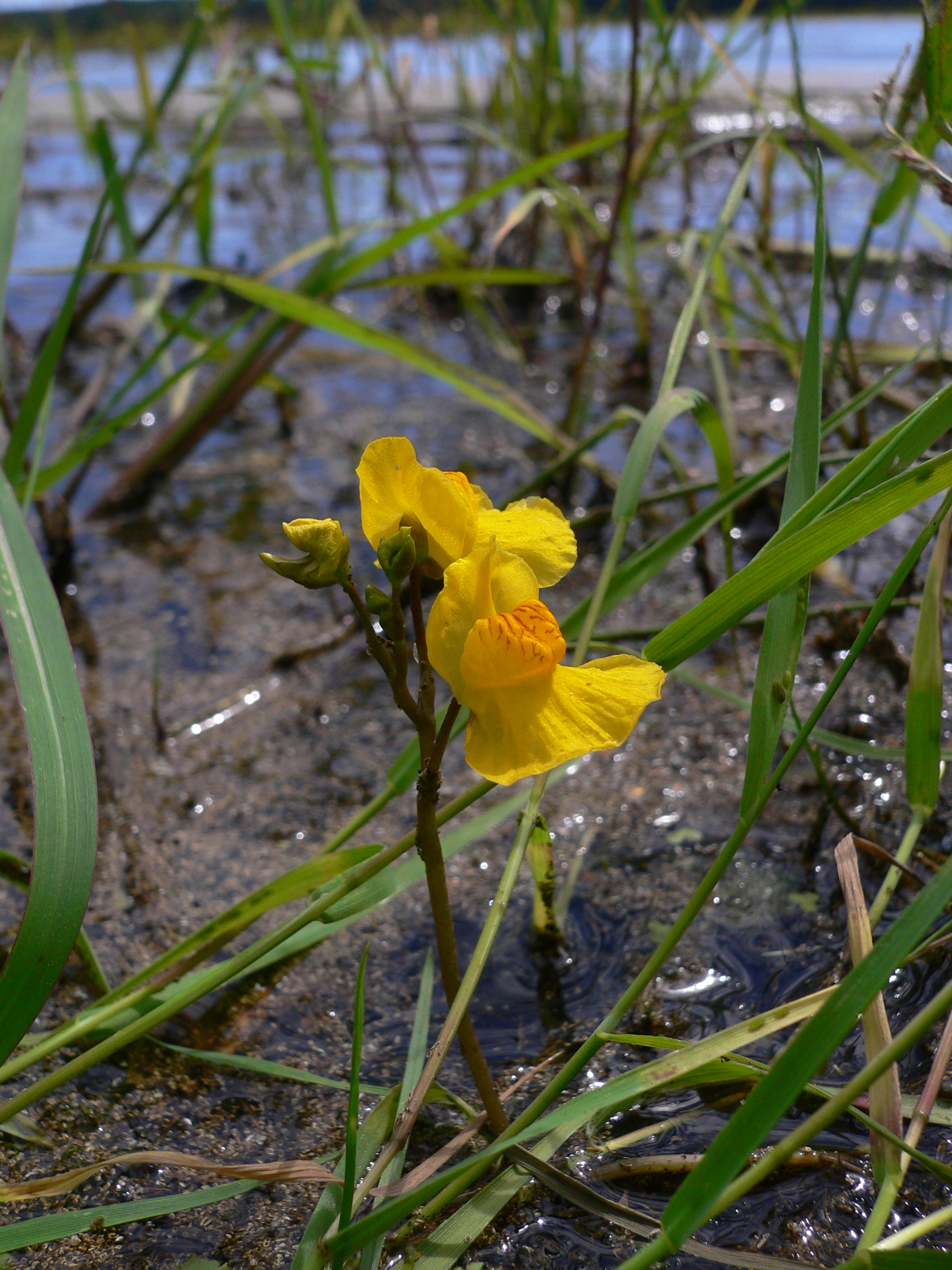

Scientific classification
- Kingdom: Plantae
- Clade: Tracheophytes
- Clade: Angiosperms
- Clade: Eudicots
- Clade: Asterids
- Order: Lamiales
- Family: Lentibulariaceae
- Genus: Utricularia
- Subgenus: Utricularia subg. Utricularia
- Section: Utricularia sect. Utricularia
- Species: U. australis

Binomial name
- Utricularia australis R.Br. (1810)

Infraspecific taxa
- U. a. f. fixa (Komiya) Komiya & Shibata (1980); U. a. f. tenuicaulis (Miki) Komiya & Shibata (1980); U. a. mod. platylobus (Glueck) D.Schmidt (1985); U. a. mod. typicus (Glueck) D.Schmidt (1985); U. a. var. tenuicaulis (Miki) S.Hatusima (1994)

Synonyms
- Utricularia aquatica L. ex P.Font-Quer (1973) nom.nud.; Utricularia aurea auct. non Lour.: Erickson (1968) [=U. aurea/U. australis]; Utricularia dubia auct. non Benj.: Rosselini ex Cesati (1881) nom.illeg.; Utricularia flexuosa auct. non Vahl: Benth. (1869) [=U. aurea/U. australis]; Utricularia flexuosa auct. non Vahl: Moore (1893); Utricularia flexuosa auct. non Vahl: Oliv. (1859) [=U. aurea/U. australis/U. bifida/U. caerulea]; Utricularia galloprovincialis Gay ex Webb (1876) nom.nud.; Utricularia incerta Kam. (1902); Utricularia intermedia auct. non Hayne: Godet (1853); Utricularia jankae Velen. (1886); Utricularia japonica Makino (1914); Utricularia major Schmidel (1771) nom.illeg.; Utricularia mutata Leiner ex Doell (1859); Utricularia neglecta Lehm. (1828); Utricularia neglecta f. crassicaulis Hoeppner (1912); Utricularia neglecta f. gracilis Hoeppner (1912); Utricularia neglecta f. platyloba (Meist.) Glueck (1906); Utricularia neglecta f. platyphylla De Wit (1983) sphalm.typogr.; Utricularia neglecta f. typica Glueck (1906) nom.illeg.; Utricularia neglecta var. gallaecica Merino (1906); Utricularia neglecta var. jankae (Velen.) Glueck (1936); Utricularia pollichii F.Schultz (1871); Utricularia protrusa Hook.f. (1853); Utricularia sacciformis Benj. (1847); Utricularia siakujiiensis Nakajima ex Hara (1948); Utricularia spectabilis Madauss. (1853); Utricularia stellaris auct. non L.f.: F.W.Andrews (1956) [=U. australis/U. stellaris]; Utricularia stellaris auct. non L.f.: Wager (1928); Utricularia tenuicaulis Miki (1935); Utricularia vulgaris f. fixa Komiya (1972); Utricularia vulgaris f. tenera Hjelt (1920); Utricularia vulgaris f. tenuicaulis (Miki) Komiya (1972); Utricularia vulgaris f. tenuis Saelan (1883); Utricularia vulgaris lus. platyloba Meist. (1900); Utricularia vulgaris race major (Schmidel) Rouy (1909) nom.illeg.; Utricularia vulgaris subsp. dubia (auct. non Benj.: Rossellini ex Cesati) Nyman (1881); Utricularia vulgaris var. formosana Kou (1968); Utricularia vulgaris var. japonica (Makino) M.Tamura (1953); Utricularia vulgaris var. mutata (Leiner ex Doell) Doell (1859); Utricularia vulgaris var. neglecta (Lehm.) Coss. & Germain (1861); Utricularia vulgaris var. rhenana Meist. (1900); Utricularia vulgaris var. tenuicaulis (Miki) Kou (1968); Utricularia vulgaris var. tenuis (Saelan) Hjelt (1920); Utricularia vulgaris auct. non L.: Pollich (1776); Utricularia vulgaris auct. non L.: P.Taylor (1964) [=U. australis/U. vulgaris]

= Utricularia australis =

Species of plant

Utricularia australis is a medium-sized, perennial species of aquatic bladderwort. This species has a vast geographic range, being found throughout Europe, in tropical and temperate Asia including China and Japan in the east, Central and Southern Africa, Australia and the North Island of New Zealand. The specific epithet "australis" is Latin for "southern" and reflects the fact that the discovery of this species was made in Australia in 1810.
