= Common bladderwort =

Common bladderwort is a common name for several plants and may refer to:

- Utricularia macrorhiza, in North America and eastern temperate Asia
- Utricularia vulgaris, in Asia and Europe
