= U. nepalensis =

U. nepalensis may refer to:

- Ulmus nepalensis, a flowering plant
- Uncothedon nepalensis, a clearwing moth
- Uropoda nepalensis, a mite with a single pair of spiracles positioned laterally on the body
- Utricularia nepalensis, a carnivorous plant
