= Utricularia reflexa =

Scientific classification
- Kingdom: Plantae
- Clade: Tracheophytes
- Clade: Angiosperms
- Clade: Eudicots
- Clade: Asterids
- Order: Lamiales
- Family: Lentibulariaceae
- Genus: Utricularia
- Subgenus: Utricularia subg. Utricularia
- Section: Utricularia sect. Utricularia
- Species: U. reflexa

Binomial name
- Utricularia reflexa Oliv.

Synonyms
- U. bangweolensis R.E.Fr.; U. charoidea Stapf; U. diploglossa Welw. ex Oliv.; U. grandivesiculosa Czech; U. imerinensis H.Perrier; U. magnavesica R.D.Good; U. pilifera A.Chev.; U. platyptera Stapf; U. reflexa var. parviflora P.Taylor; U. reflexa var. reflexa P.Taylor

Species of carnivorous plant

Utricularia reflexa is a small to medium-sized suspended aquatic carnivorous plant that belongs to the genus Utricularia. U. reflexa is native to Africa and can be found in Benin, Burkina Faso, Burundi, Cameroon, Chad, the Central African Republic, Côte d'Ivoire, the Democratic Republic of the Congo, Gambia, Ghana, Guinea, Kenya, Madagascar, Malawi, Mali, Niger, Nigeria, Senegal, Sierra Leone, Sudan, Tanzania, Togo, Uganda, Zambia, and Zimbabwe.

== See also ==
- List of Utricularia species
