= Utricularia perversa =

Scientific classification
- Kingdom: Plantae
- Clade: Tracheophytes
- Clade: Angiosperms
- Clade: Eudicots
- Clade: Asterids
- Order: Lamiales
- Family: Lentibulariaceae
- Genus: Utricularia
- Subgenus: Utricularia subg. Utricularia
- Section: Utricularia sect. Utricularia
- Species: U. perversa

Binomial name
- Utricularia perversa P.Taylor

Species of carnivorous plant

Utricularia perversa is a medium-sized suspended aquatic carnivorous plant that belongs to the genus Utricularia. It is probably most closely related to U. radiata. U. perversa is endemic to the Mexican states of Chihuahua and Guanajuato. It is found at altitudes around 2,000 metres (6,561.7 ft) in shallow pools of water.

== See also ==
- List of Utricularia species
