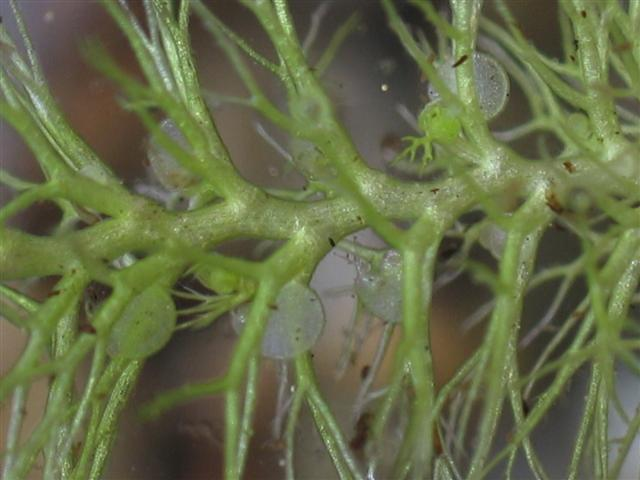

Scientific classification
- Kingdom: Plantae
- Clade: Tracheophytes
- Clade: Angiosperms
- Clade: Eudicots
- Clade: Asterids
- Order: Lamiales
- Family: Lentibulariaceae
- Genus: Utricularia
- Subgenus: Utricularia subg. Utricularia
- Section: Utricularia sect. Utricularia
- Species: U. dimorphantha

Binomial name
- Utricularia dimorphantha Makino 1906

Synonyms
- [U. minor Iinuma]

= Utricularia dimorphantha =

Species of carnivorous plant

Utricularia dimorphantha is a species of suspended aquatic carnivorous plant that belongs to the genus Utricularia (family Lentibulariaceae). It is a medium-sized perennial plant. It is endemic to Japan.

== See also ==
- List of Utricularia species
