= Utricularia naviculata =

Scientific classification
- Kingdom: Plantae
- Clade: Embryophytes
- Clade: Tracheophytes
- Clade: Angiosperms
- Clade: Eudicots
- Clade: Asterids
- Order: Lamiales
- Family: Lentibulariaceae
- Genus: Utricularia
- Subgenus: Utricularia subg. Utricularia
- Section: Utricularia sect. Utricularia
- Species: U. naviculata

Binomial name
- Utricularia naviculata P.Taylor

Species of carnivorous plant

Utricularia naviculata is a very small, annual suspended aquatic carnivorous plant that belongs to the genus Utricularia. It is a very distinct species with relatively large bracts and unique trap-bearing shoots ("leaves"). U. naviculata is endemic to South America and is known only from the type location in Venezuela and a single collection in Brazil. It is found at low altitudes in slow-flowing or still waters. It has been found flowering in Brazil during the month of May and in Venezuela during August. It was first formally described by Peter Taylor in 1967.

== See also ==
- List of Utricularia species
