= Utricularia muelleri =

Scientific classification
- Kingdom: Plantae
- Clade: Tracheophytes
- Clade: Angiosperms
- Clade: Eudicots
- Clade: Asterids
- Order: Lamiales
- Family: Lentibulariaceae
- Genus: Utricularia
- Subgenus: Utricularia subg. Utricularia
- Section: Utricularia sect. Utricularia
- Species: U. muelleri

Binomial name
- Utricularia muelleri Kamiénski

Synonyms
- [U. inflexa var. stellaris P.Taylor]; [U. stellaris Benth.]

Species of carnivorous plant

Utricularia muelleri is a medium-sized, perennial suspended aquatic carnivorous plant that belongs to the genus Utricularia. U. muelleri is endemic to Australia and Papua New Guinea.

== See also ==
- List of Utricularia species
