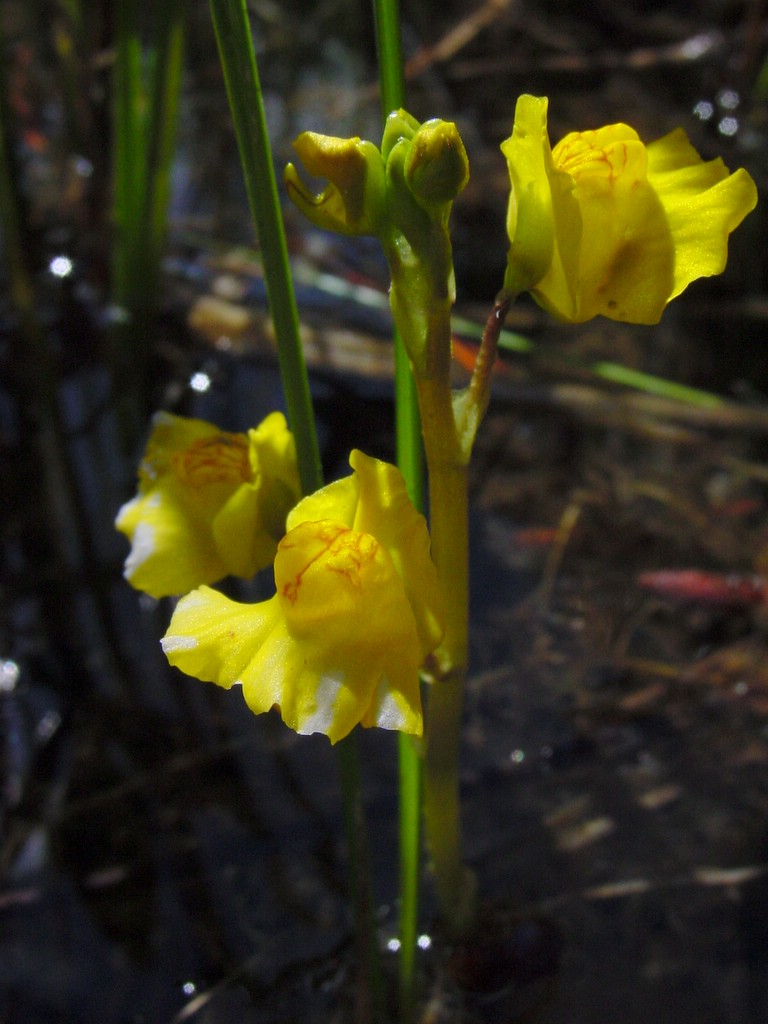
- Utricularia macrorhiza

Scientific classification
- Kingdom: Plantae
- Clade: Tracheophytes
- Clade: Angiosperms
- Clade: Eudicots
- Clade: Asterids
- Order: Lamiales
- Family: Lentibulariaceae
- Genus: Utricularia
- Subgenus: Utricularia subg. Utricularia
- Section: Utricularia sect. Utricularia

Type species
- U. vulgaris L.

Species
- Utricularia aurea; Utricularia australis; Utricularia benjaminiana; Utricularia biovularioides; Utricularia bremii; Utricularia breviscapa; Utricularia chiakiana; Utricularia corneliana; Utricularia cymbantha; Utricularia dimorphantha; Utricularia floridana; Utricularia foliosa; Utricularia geminiscapa; Utricularia gibba; Utricularia hydrocarpa; Utricularia incisa; Utricularia inflata; Utricularia inflexa; Utricularia intermedia; Utricularia macrorhiza; Utricularia minor; Utricularia muelleri; Utricularia naviculata; Utricularia ochroleuca; Utricularia olivacea; Utricularia perversa; Utricularia platensis; Utricularia poconensis; Utricularia punctata; Utricularia radiata; Utricularia raynalii; Utricularia reflexa; Utricularia stellaris; Utricularia striata; Utricularia stygia; Utricularia vulgaris; Utricularia warmingii

= Utricularia sect. Utricularia =

Group of carnivorous plants

Utricularia sect. Utricularia is a section in the genus Utricularia. The species in this section are suspended or affixed aquatic carnivorous plants.

== See also ==
- List of Utricularia species
