= Utricularia raynalii =

Scientific classification
- Kingdom: Plantae
- Clade: Tracheophytes
- Clade: Angiosperms
- Clade: Eudicots
- Clade: Asterids
- Order: Lamiales
- Family: Lentibulariaceae
- Genus: Utricularia
- Subgenus: Utricularia subg. Utricularia
- Section: Utricularia sect. Utricularia
- Species: U. raynalii

Binomial name
- Utricularia raynalii P.Taylor

Species of plant

Utricularia raynalii is a small, annual, suspended aquatic carnivorous plant that belongs to the genus Utricularia. U. raynalii is endemic to tropical Africa and can be found in Burkina Faso, Cameroon, the Central African Republic, Chad, Rwanda, Senegal, and Sudan. It was described by Peter Taylor in 1986 and was named in honor of Jean Raynal of the Paris Herbarium who had collected this species in Cameroon and Rwanda.

== See also ==
- List of Utricularia species
