= Utricularia warmingii =

Scientific classification
- Kingdom: Plantae
- Clade: Tracheophytes
- Clade: Angiosperms
- Clade: Eudicots
- Clade: Asterids
- Order: Lamiales
- Family: Lentibulariaceae
- Genus: Utricularia
- Subgenus: Utricularia subg. Utricularia
- Section: Utricularia sect. Utricularia
- Species: U. warmingii

Binomial name
- Utricularia warmingii Kamiénski

Synonyms
- U. hoehnii Kuhlm.; [U. hydrocarpa P.Taylor]

Species of carnivorous plant

Utricularia warmingii is a small, annual suspended aquatic carnivorous plant that belongs to the genus Utricularia. U. warmingii is endemic to South America and can be found in Bolivia, Brazil, and Venezuela.

== See also ==
- List of Utricularia species
