= Utricularia cymbantha =

Conservation status
- Least Concern (IUCN 3.1)

Scientific classification
- Kingdom: Plantae
- Clade: Tracheophytes
- Clade: Angiosperms
- Clade: Eudicots
- Clade: Asterids
- Order: Lamiales
- Family: Lentibulariaceae
- Genus: Utricularia
- Subgenus: Utricularia subg. Utricularia
- Section: Utricularia sect. Utricularia
- Species: U. cymbantha

Binomial name
- Utricularia cymbantha Oliv. 1865

Synonyms
- List: Biovularia cymbantha (Oliv.) Kamiénski 1902; Sacculina madecassa Bosser 1956; U. stephensiae Lloyd 1942

Species of carnivorous plant

Utricularia cymbantha is a very small suspended aquatic carnivorous plant that belongs to the genus Utricularia (family Lentibulariaceae). It is an annual plant. Its native distribution includes tropical and South Africa.

== See also ==
- List of Utricularia species
