= Utricularia stygia =

Scientific classification
- Kingdom: Plantae
- Clade: Tracheophytes
- Clade: Angiosperms
- Clade: Eudicots
- Clade: Asterids
- Order: Lamiales
- Family: Lentibulariaceae
- Genus: Utricularia
- Subgenus: Utricularia subg. Utricularia
- Section: Utricularia sect. Utricularia
- Species: U. stygia

Binomial name
- Utricularia stygia G.Thor

Species of carnivorous plant

Utricularia stygia, the arctic bladderwort or Northern bladderwort, is an affixed aquatic carnivorous plant that belongs to the genus Utricularia. U. stygia is native to northern Europe and North America. This species was originally published by Göran Thor in 1987 but the description was not in Latin and was therefore nomenclaturally invalid. Thor validly published the species a year later. The cited difference that separates U. stygia from U. ochroleuca is the shape of the tiny quadrifid glands inside the bladders, specifically at which angle the "arms" of these glands diverge from one another. Thor, when working on the Utricularia of Sweden noted that this distinction alone allowed for consistent species identification. Both Barry Rice and Peter Taylor have expressed concerns regarding how this method applies to other populations around the world.

== See also ==
- List of Utricularia species
