= Utricularia benjaminiana =

Scientific classification
- Kingdom: Plantae
- Clade: Tracheophytes
- Clade: Angiosperms
- Clade: Eudicots
- Clade: Asterids
- Order: Lamiales
- Family: Lentibulariaceae
- Genus: Utricularia
- Subgenus: Utricularia subg. Utricularia
- Section: Utricularia sect. Utricularia
- Species: U. benjaminiana

Binomial name
- Utricularia benjaminiana Oliv. 1860

Synonyms
- Akentra inflata Benj. 1847 U. cervicornuta Perrier 1955 U. gillettii De Wild. & Th. Durand 1909 U. inflata (Benj.) Miq. 1850 ? U. paradoxa Lloyd & G.Taylor (1947) U. puberula Klotzsch 1848, name only U. villosula Stapf 1906

Species of carnivorous plant

Utricularia benjaminiana is a medium-sized suspended or affixed, aquatic, perennial carnivorous plant that belongs to the genus Utricularia (family Lentibulariaceae). Its native distribution includes countries in Africa and Central and South America.

== See also ==
- List of Utricularia species
