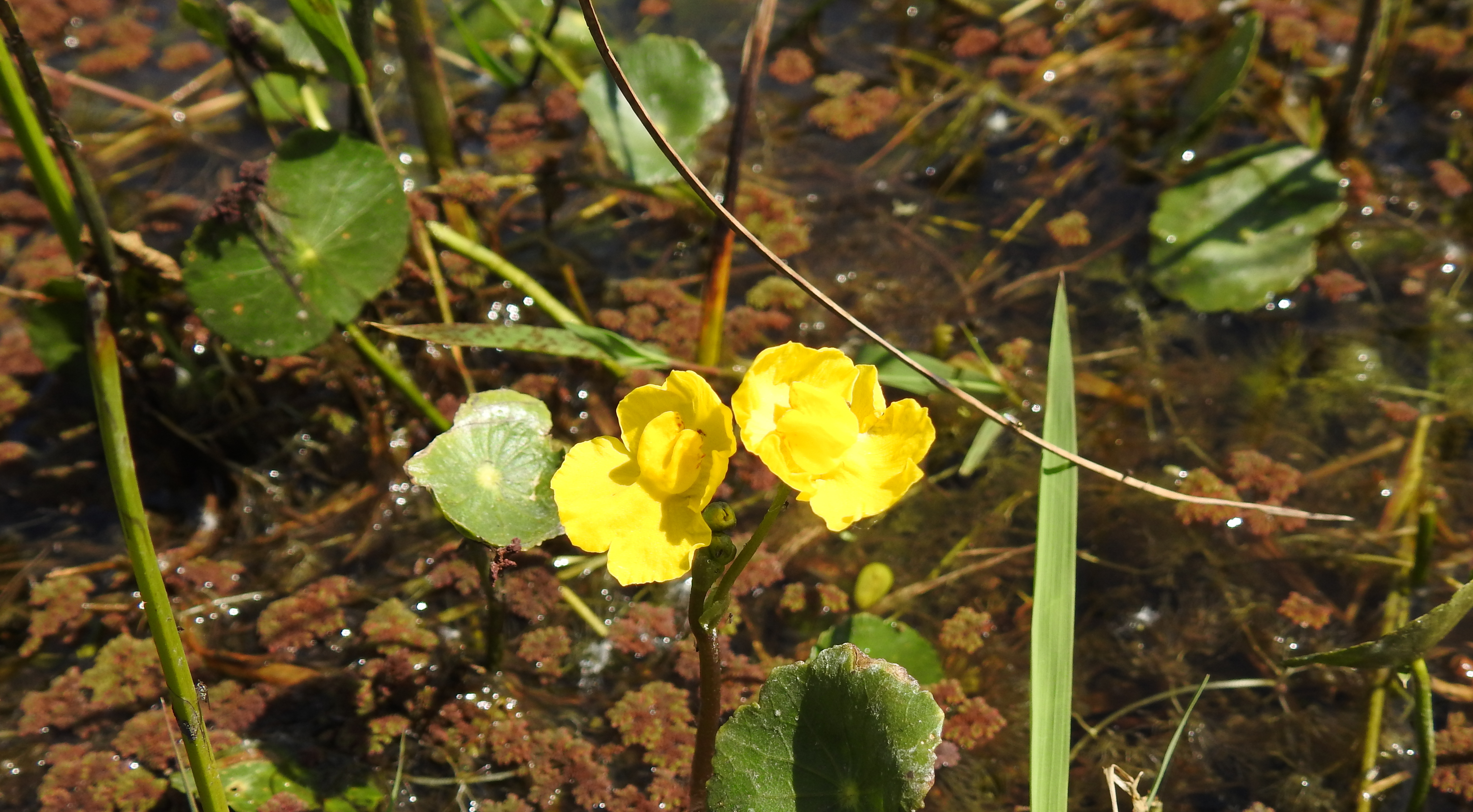

Scientific classification
- Kingdom: Plantae
- Clade: Tracheophytes
- Clade: Angiosperms
- Clade: Eudicots
- Clade: Asterids
- Order: Lamiales
- Family: Lentibulariaceae
- Genus: Utricularia
- Subgenus: Utricularia subg. Utricularia
- Section: Utricularia sect. Utricularia
- Species: U. platensis

Binomial name
- Utricularia platensis Speg.

Synonyms
- [U. inflata Chodat & Fabris]

= Utricularia platensis =

Species of carnivorous plant

Utricularia platensis is a medium or large-sized perennial suspended aquatic carnivorous plant that belongs to the genus Utricularia. U. platensis is endemic to South America.

== See also ==
- List of Utricularia species
