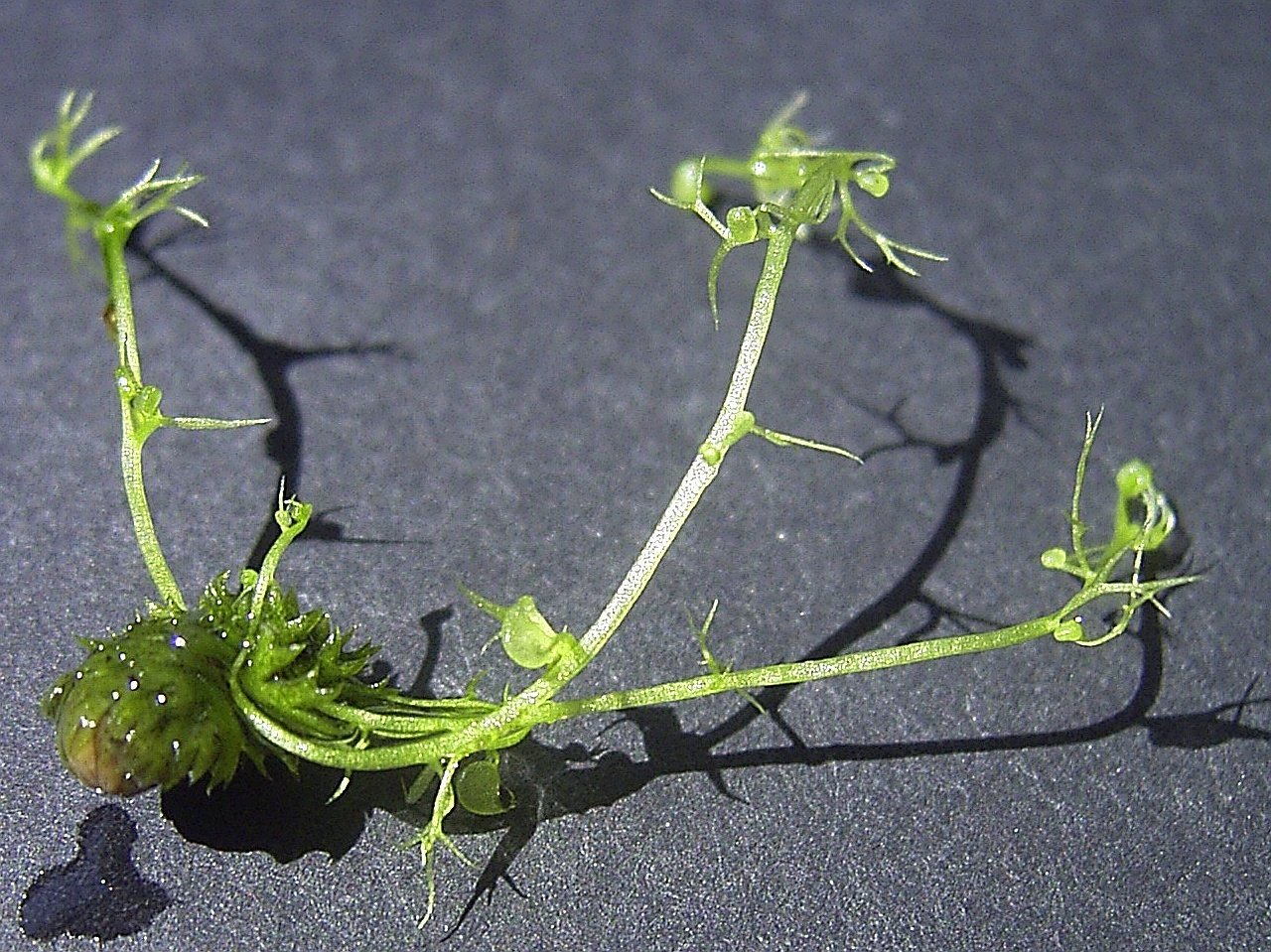

Scientific classification
- Kingdom: Plantae
- Clade: Tracheophytes
- Clade: Angiosperms
- Clade: Eudicots
- Clade: Asterids
- Order: Lamiales
- Family: Lentibulariaceae
- Genus: Utricularia
- Subgenus: Utricularia subg. Utricularia
- Section: Utricularia sect. Utricularia
- Species: U. bremii

Binomial name
- Utricularia bremii Heer ex Kölliker 1830

Synonyms
- U. minor subsp. bremii (Heer ex Kölliker) Franchet 1885 U. minor var. bremii (Heer ex Kölliker) K. & F. Bertsch 1948 U. pulchella C.B.Lehm 1843

= Utricularia bremii =

Species of plant

Utricularia bremii is a small, suspended or affixed aquatic carnivorous plant that belongs to the genus Utricularia (family Lentibulariaceae). It is a perennial plant that was named in honour of Jacob Bremi. Its native distribution includes central and western Europe.

== See also ==
- List of Utricularia species
