= Utricularia incisa =

Scientific classification
- Kingdom: Plantae
- Clade: Tracheophytes
- Clade: Angiosperms
- Clade: Eudicots
- Clade: Asterids
- Order: Lamiales
- Family: Lentibulariaceae
- Genus: Utricularia
- Subgenus: Utricularia subg. Utricularia
- Section: Utricularia sect. Utricularia
- Species: U. incisa

Binomial name
- Utricularia incisa (A.Rich.) Alain 1956

Synonyms
- Drosera incisa A.Rich. 1845 U. porphyrophylla Wright ex Griseb. 1866

Species of carnivorous plant

Utricularia incisa is a medium-sized suspended aquatic carnivorous plant that belongs to the genus Utricularia (family Lentibulariaceae). It is probably a perennial plant. U. incisa is only known from specimens from Cuba (Isle of Pines and Pinar del Río) and appears to be endemic to the country.

== See also ==
- List of Utricularia species
