= Utricularia poconensis =

Scientific classification
- Kingdom: Plantae
- Clade: Tracheophytes
- Clade: Angiosperms
- Clade: Eudicots
- Clade: Asterids
- Order: Lamiales
- Family: Lentibulariaceae
- Genus: Utricularia
- Subgenus: Utricularia subg. Utricularia
- Section: Utricularia sect. Utricularia
- Species: U. poconensis

Binomial name
- Utricularia poconensis Fromm

Synonyms
- [U. hydrocarpa Dawson]; U. luetzelburgii Merl ex Luetz.

Species of carnivorous plant

Utricularia poconensis is a large suspended aquatic carnivorous plant that belongs to the genus Utricularia. U. poconensis is endemic to South America and is found in Brazil, Bolivia, and Argentina.

== See also ==
- List of Utricularia species
