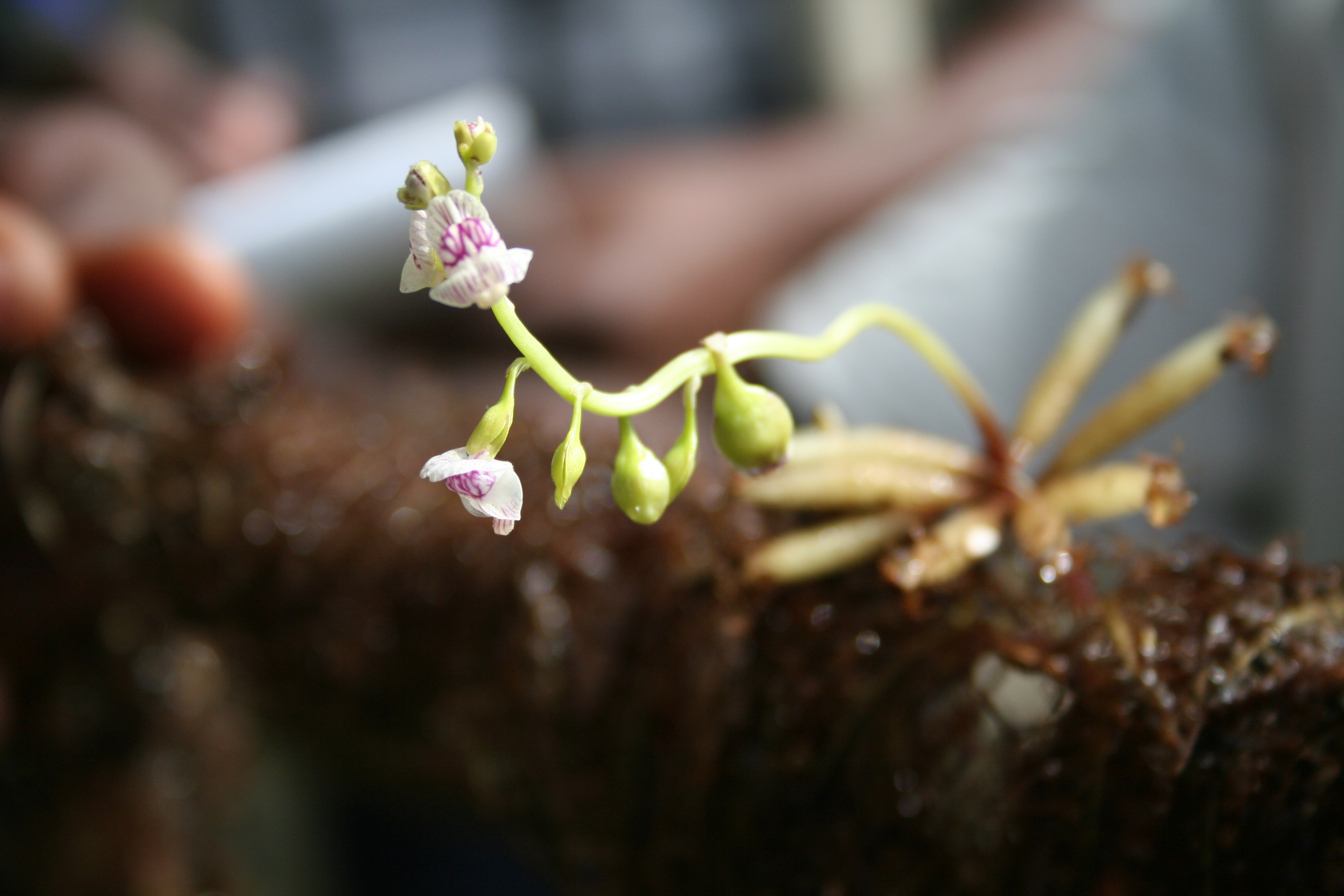

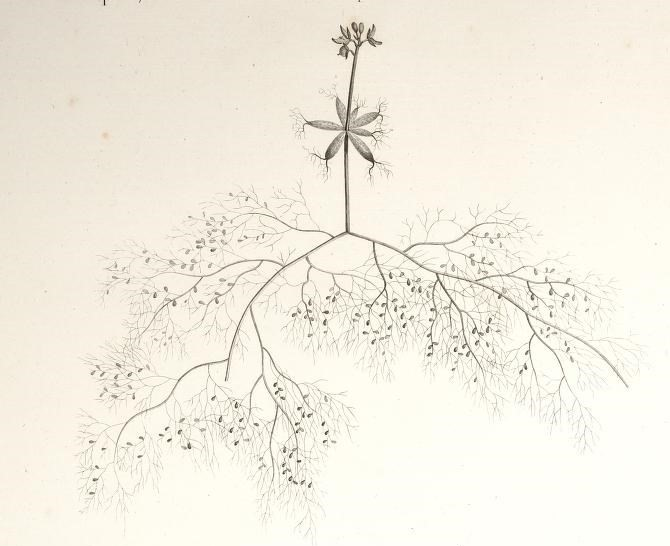

Scientific classification
- Kingdom: Plantae
- Clade: Tracheophytes
- Clade: Angiosperms
- Clade: Eudicots
- Clade: Asterids
- Order: Lamiales
- Family: Lentibulariaceae
- Genus: Utricularia
- Subgenus: Utricularia subg. Utricularia
- Section: Utricularia sect. Utricularia
- Species: U. inflexa

Binomial name
- Utricularia inflexa Forssk.

Synonyms
- Hamulia alba Raf.; U. inflexa var. inflexa P.Taylor; U. inflexa var. major Kamiénski; U. inflexa var. remota Kamiénski; U. inflexa var. tenuifolia Kamiénski; U. oliveri Kamiénski; U. oliveri var. fimbriata Kamiénski; U. oliveri var. schweinfurthii Kamiénski; [U. stellaris H.Perrier]; U. stellaris var. inflexa (Forssk.) C.B.Clarke; U. thonningii Schum.; U. thonningii var. laciniata Stapf

= Utricularia inflexa =

Species of carnivorous plant

Utricularia inflexa is a medium to large sized suspended aquatic carnivorous plant that belongs to the genus Utricularia. It is probably a perennial plant. U. inflexa is endemic to Africa and the Indian subcontinent.

== See also ==
- List of Utricularia species
