= Utricularia chiakiana =

Scientific classification
- Kingdom: Plantae
- Clade: Embryophytes
- Clade: Tracheophytes
- Clade: Angiosperms
- Clade: Eudicots
- Clade: Asterids
- Order: Lamiales
- Family: Lentibulariaceae
- Genus: Utricularia
- Subgenus: Utricularia subg. Utricularia
- Section: Utricularia sect. Utricularia
- Species: U. chiakiana

Binomial name
- Utricularia chiakiana Komiya & C.Shibata

Species of carnivorous plant

Utricularia chiakiana is an affixed or suspended aquatic carnivorous plant that belongs to the genus Utricularia (family Lentibulariaceae). It is native to Venezuela and was first described by Sadashi Komiya and Chiaki Shibata in 1997.

== See also ==
- List of Utricularia species
