= Utricularia punctata =

Conservation status
- Least Concern (IUCN 3.1)

Scientific classification
- Kingdom: Plantae
- Clade: Tracheophytes
- Clade: Angiosperms
- Clade: Eudicots
- Clade: Asterids
- Order: Lamiales
- Family: Lentibulariaceae
- Genus: Utricularia
- Subgenus: Utricularia subg. Utricularia
- Section: Utricularia sect. Utricularia
- Species: U. punctata

Binomial name
- Utricularia punctata Wall. ex A.DC.

Synonyms
- [U. aurea P.Taylor]; U. fluitans Ridl.

Species of carnivorous plant

Utricularia punctata is a medium-sized suspended aquatic carnivorous plant that belongs to the genus Utricularia. U. punctata is native to Borneo, Burma, China, Peninsular Malaysia, Sumatra, Thailand, and Vietnam.

== See also ==
- List of Utricularia species
