= Utricularia biovularioides =

Scientific classification
- Kingdom: Plantae
- Clade: Tracheophytes
- Clade: Angiosperms
- Clade: Eudicots
- Clade: Asterids
- Order: Lamiales
- Family: Lentibulariaceae
- Genus: Utricularia
- Subgenus: Utricularia subg. Utricularia
- Section: Utricularia sect. Utricularia
- Species: U. biovularioides

Binomial name
- Utricularia biovularioides (Kuhlm.) P.Taylor 1986

Synonyms
- Saccolaria biovularioides Kuhlm. 1914 U. sp. aff. spruceana Kuhlm. 1940

Species of carnivorous plant

Utricularia biovularioides is a small, suspended aquatic annual carnivorous plant that belongs to the genus Utricularia (family Lentibulariaceae). It is endemic to Brazil and, as of Peter Taylor's 1989 monograph on the genus, has only been located twice. The type specimen has not been located.

== See also ==
- List of Utricularia species
