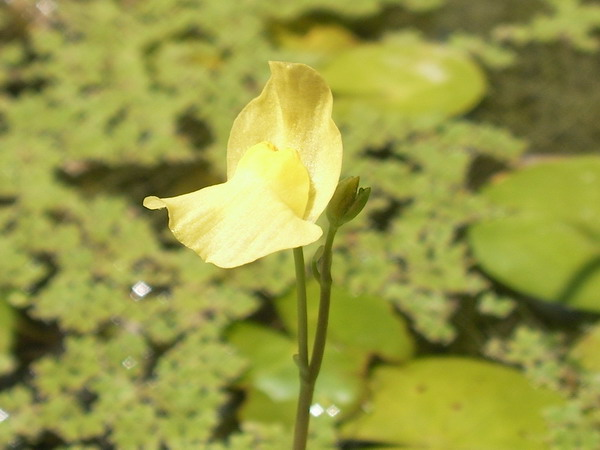

Conservation status
- Least Concern (IUCN 3.1)

Scientific classification
- Kingdom: Plantae
- Clade: Embryophytes
- Clade: Tracheophytes
- Clade: Spermatophytes
- Clade: Angiosperms
- Clade: Eudicots
- Clade: Asterids
- Order: Lamiales
- Family: Lentibulariaceae
- Genus: Utricularia
- Subgenus: Utricularia subg. Utricularia
- Section: Utricularia sect. Utricularia
- Species: U. aurea

Binomial name
- Utricularia aurea Lour.

Synonyms
- List: Utricularia aurea f. immaculata Tamura; Utricularia blumei (A.DC.) Miq.; Utricularia calumpitensis Llanos; Utricularia confervifolia Jacks. ex D.Don; Utricularia extensa Hance; Utricularia fasciculata Roxb.; Utricularia flexuosa Vahl; Utricularia flexuosa var. blumei A.DC.; Utricularia flexuosa f. gracilis Oliv.; Utricularia flexuosa var. gracilis (Oliv.) Ridl.; Utricularia inaequalis Benj.; Utricularia pilosa (Makino) Makino; Utricularia reclinata Hassk.; Utricularia vulgaris var. pilosa Makino

= Utricularia aurea =

Species of carnivorous plant

Utricularia aurea is a species of flowering plant in the family Lentibulariaceae. This medium- to large-sized suspended aquatic carnivorous plant is sometimes referred to by the common name golden bladderwort.

== Genomics ==
A chromosome-level genome assembly of Utricularia aurea was published in 2026. The genome is approximately 180.3 Mb in size, with 99.99% of the assembled sequences anchored onto 20 pseudo-chromosomes. The assembly has a BUSCO completeness of 94.98%, and 33,365 protein-coding genes were predicted.

== Distribution ==
It is the most common and widespread suspended aquatic species in Asia. It is native to Assam, Australia (New South Wales, Northern Territory, Queensland, Western Australia), Bangladesh, Borneo, Cambodia, China, East Himalaya, Hainan, India, Japan, Java, Korea, Laos, the Lesser Sunda Islands, Malaysia, Myanmar, Nepal, New Guinea, Pakistan, the Philippines, Sri Lanka, Sulawesi, Sumatra, Taiwan, Thailand, and Vietnam.

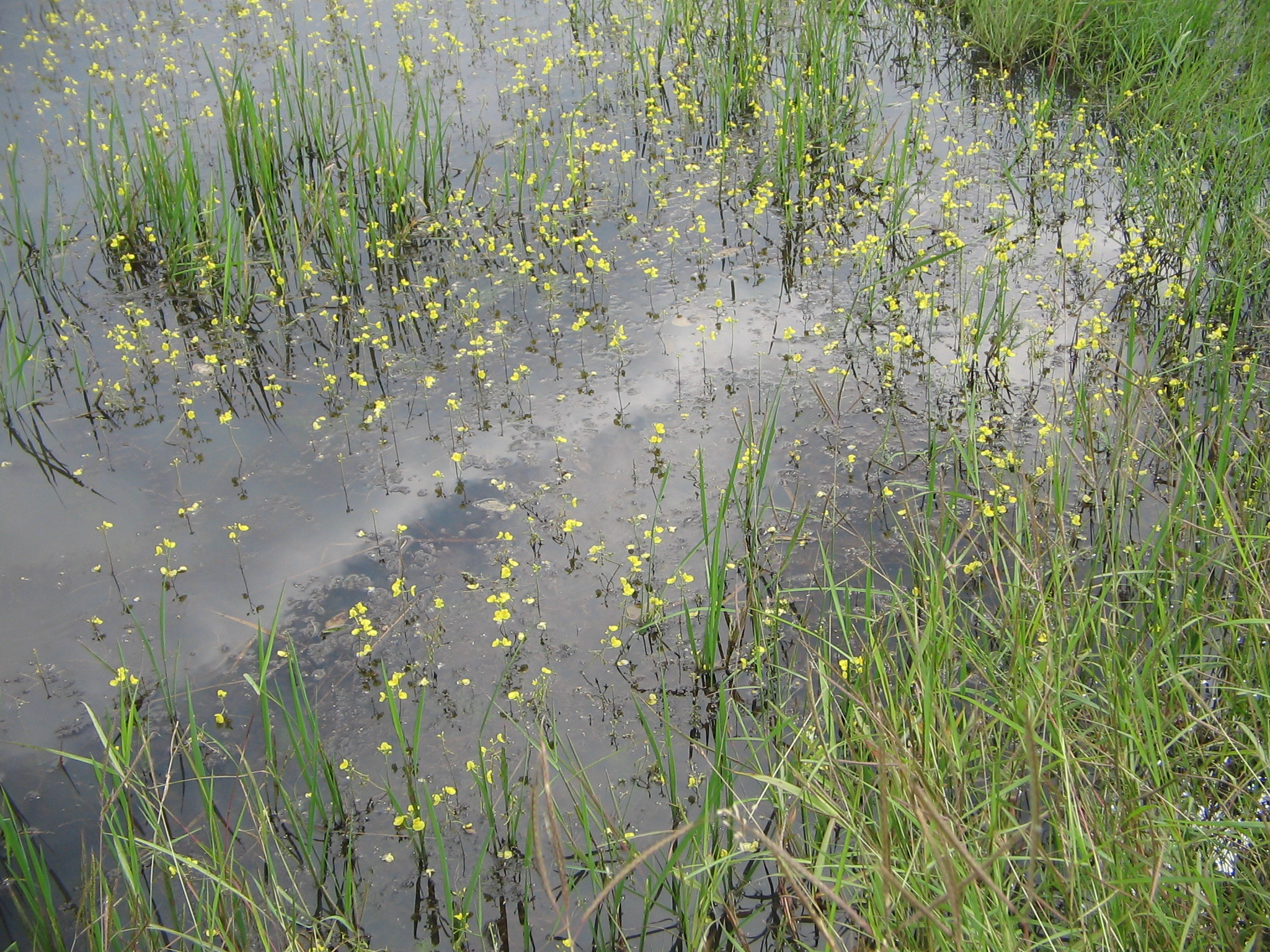
Utricularia aurea in a rice paddy

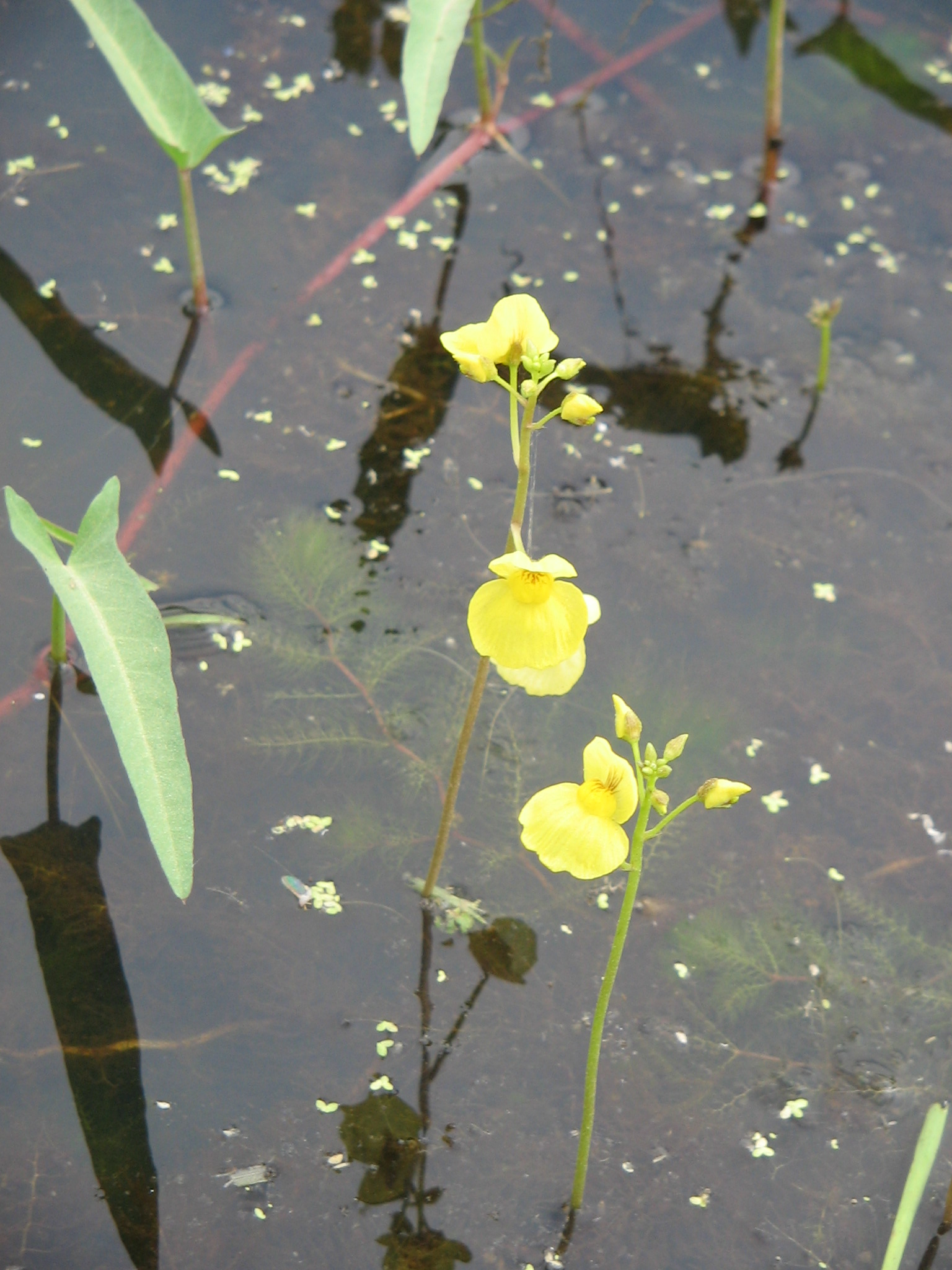
Utricularia aurea and Ipomoea aquatica

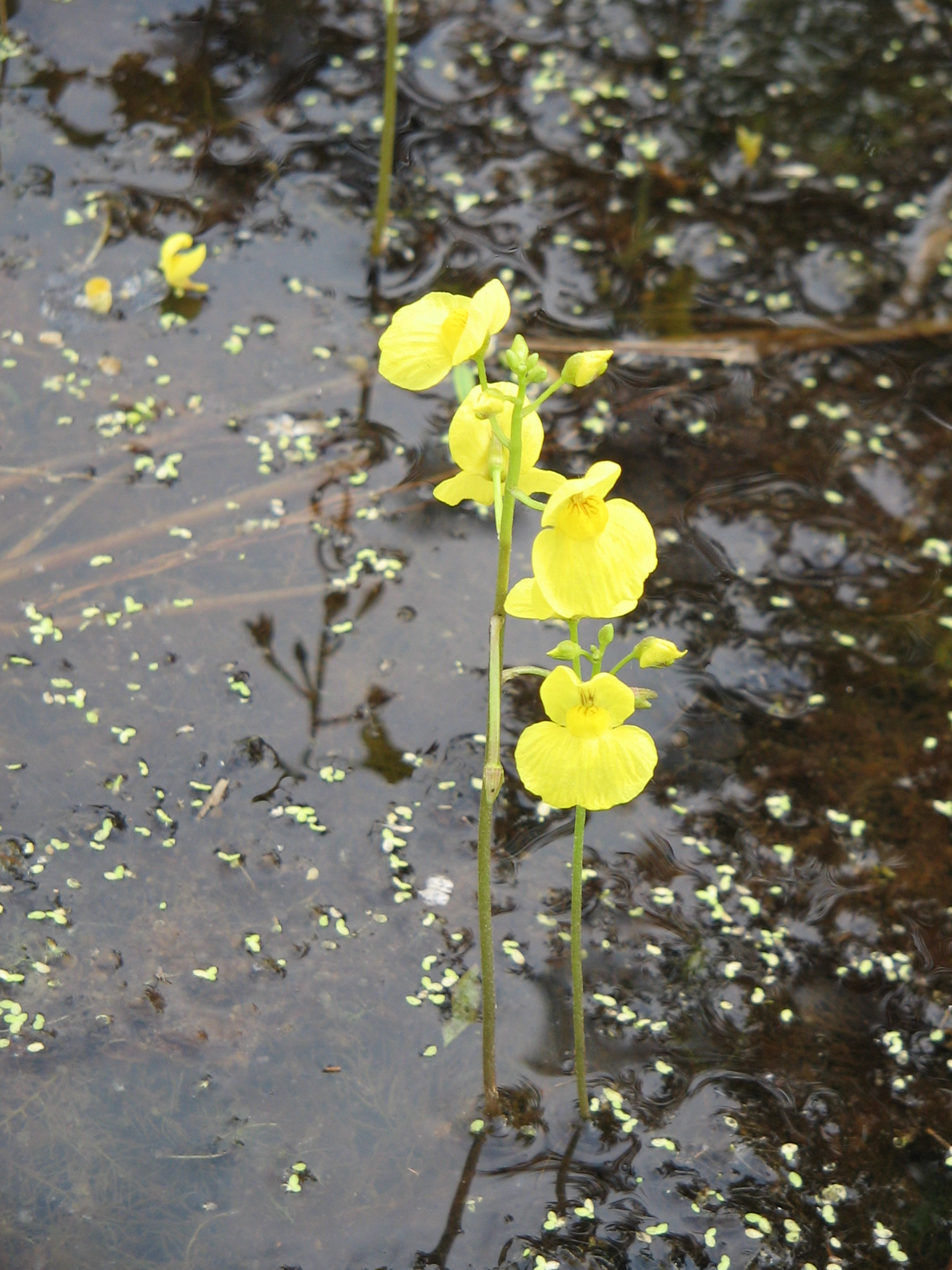
Close-up of the flowers

== See also ==
- List of Utricularia species
