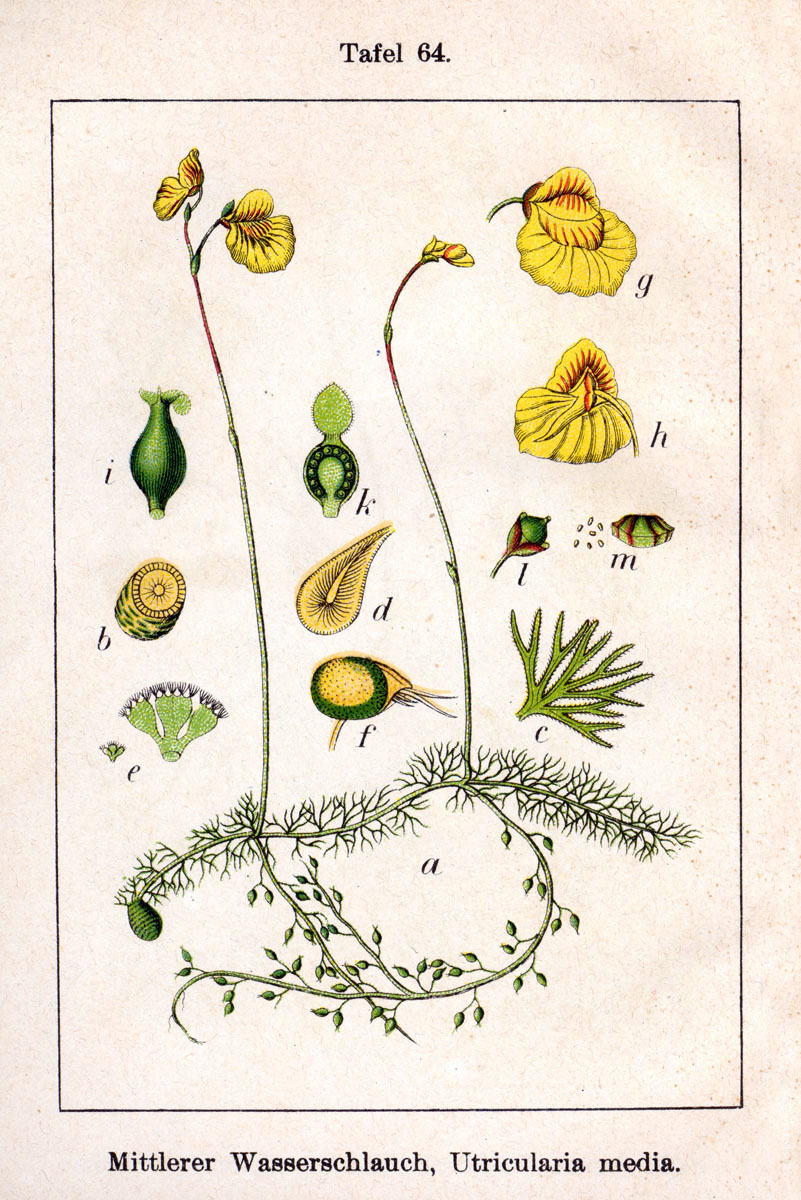

Conservation status
- Least Concern (IUCN 3.1)

Scientific classification
- Kingdom: Plantae
- Clade: Tracheophytes
- Clade: Angiosperms
- Clade: Eudicots
- Clade: Asterids
- Order: Lamiales
- Family: Lentibulariaceae
- Genus: Utricularia
- Subgenus: Utricularia subg. Utricularia
- Section: Utricularia sect. Utricularia
- Species: U. intermedia

Binomial name
- Utricularia intermedia Hayne

Synonyms
- List: Lentibularia intermedia (Hayne) Nieuwl. & Lunell; Utricularia alpina Georgi; Utricularia grafiana W.D.J.Koch; Utricularia intermedia var. terrestris Glück; Utricularia media Schumach.; Utricularia millefolia Nutt. ex Tuck.

= Utricularia intermedia =

Species of carnivorous plant

Utricularia intermedia, the flatleaf bladderwort or intermediate bladderwort is a small, perennial carnivorous plant that belongs to the genus Utricularia. It is usually found affixed to the substrate but it can also survive suspended in a body of water. U. intermedia is a circumboreal species and is found in North America, Asia, and Europe.

== See also ==
- List of Utricularia species
