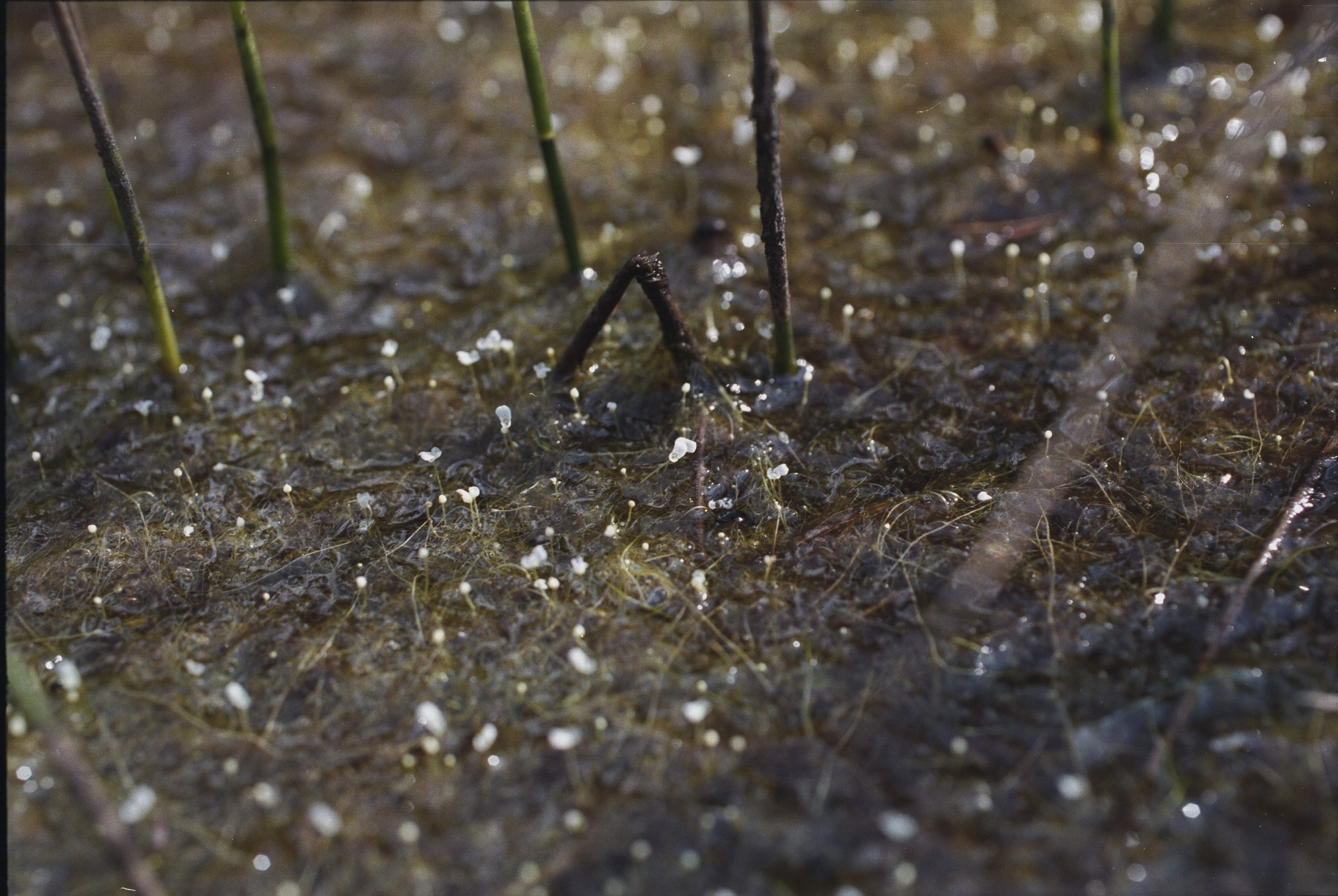

Conservation status
- Least Concern (IUCN 3.1)

Scientific classification
- Kingdom: Plantae
- Clade: Embryophytes
- Clade: Tracheophytes
- Clade: Angiosperms
- Clade: Eudicots
- Clade: Asterids
- Order: Lamiales
- Family: Lentibulariaceae
- Genus: Utricularia
- Subgenus: Utricularia subg. Utricularia
- Section: Utricularia sect. Utricularia
- Species: U. olivacea

Binomial name
- Utricularia olivacea C.Wright ex Griseb.

Synonyms
- Biovularia brasiliensis Kuhlm.; Biovularia minima (Warm.) Kamiénski; Biovularia olivacea (Wright ex Griseb.) Kamiénski; Utricularia minima Warm.

= Utricularia olivacea =

Species of aquatic plant

Utricularia olivacea, the piedmont bladderwort, is a very small, annual suspended aquatic carnivorous plant that belongs to the genus Utricularia. Utricularia olivacea is native to Central America, South America, the West Indies, and the eastern United States (coastal plain from Mississippi to New Jersey).

== See also ==
- List of Utricularia species
