= Utricularia breviscapa =

Conservation status
- Least Concern (IUCN 3.1)

Scientific classification
- Kingdom: Plantae
- Clade: Embryophytes
- Clade: Tracheophytes
- Clade: Spermatophytes
- Clade: Angiosperms
- Clade: Eudicots
- Clade: Asterids
- Order: Lamiales
- Family: Lentibulariaceae
- Genus: Utricularia
- Subgenus: Utricularia subg. Utricularia
- Section: Utricularia sect. Utricularia
- Species: U. breviscapa

Binomial name
- Utricularia breviscapa C.Wright ex Griseb.

Synonyms
- Utricularia lagoensis Warm.; Utricularia quinqueradiata Spruce ex Kamieński

Species of aquatic plant

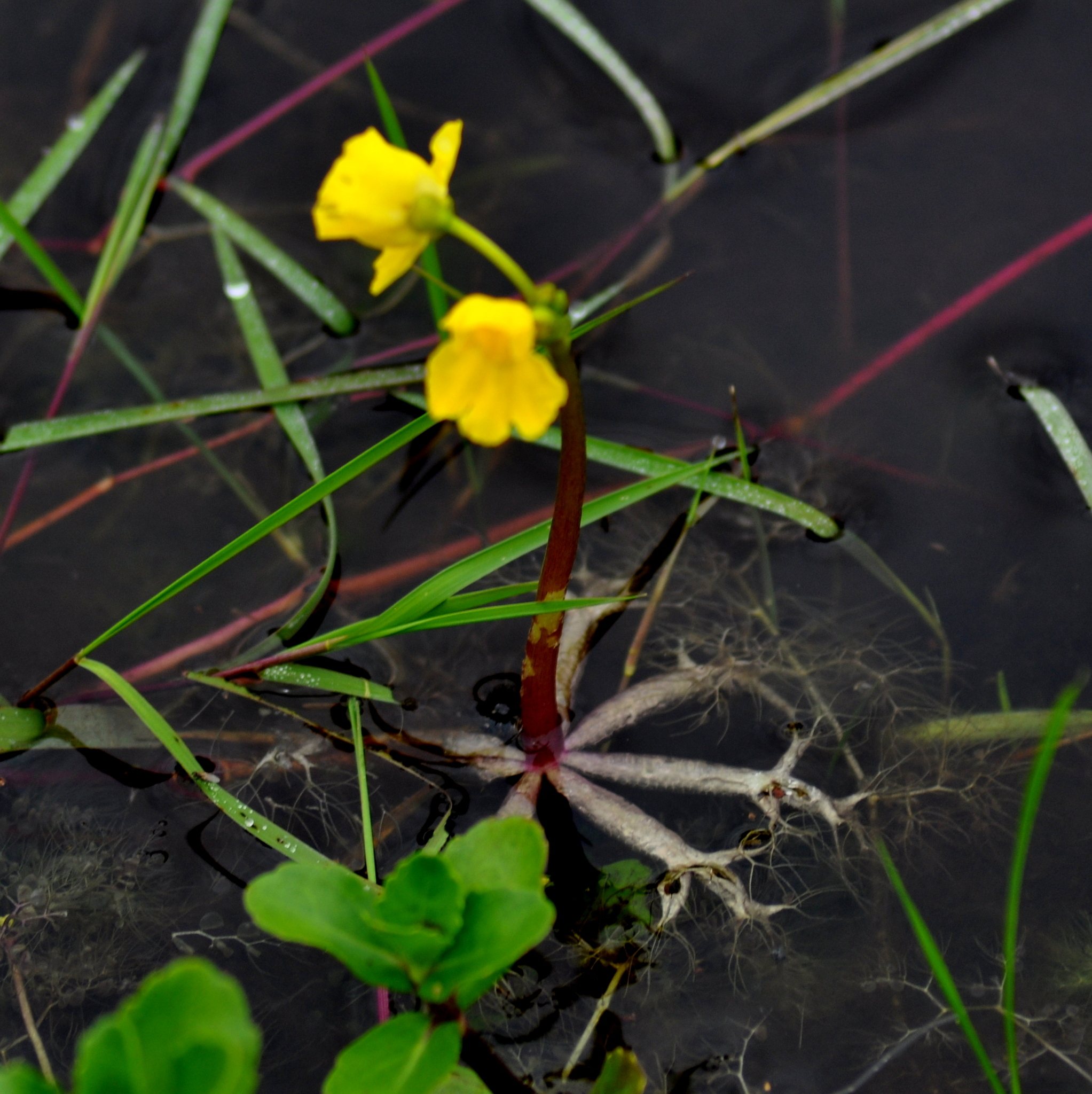
Utricularia breviscapa in Brazil

Utricularia breviscapa is a small to medium suspended aquatic carnivorous plant that belongs to the family Lentibulariaceae. It is probably an annual plant. Its native distribution includes the Antilles and South America.

== See also ==
- List of Utricularia species
