= Utricularia hydrocarpa =

Scientific classification
- Kingdom: Plantae
- Clade: Tracheophytes
- Clade: Angiosperms
- Clade: Eudicots
- Clade: Asterids
- Order: Lamiales
- Family: Lentibulariaceae
- Genus: Utricularia
- Subgenus: Utricularia subg. Utricularia
- Section: Utricularia sect. Utricularia
- Species: U. hydrocarpa

Binomial name
- Utricularia hydrocarpa Vahl 1804

Species of carnivorous plant

Utricularia hydrocarpa is a medium-sized suspended aquatic carnivorous plant that belongs to the genus Utricularia (family Lentibulariaceae). It is probably an annual plant. U. hydrocarpa is native to tropical North and South America.

== See also ==
- List of Utricularia species
