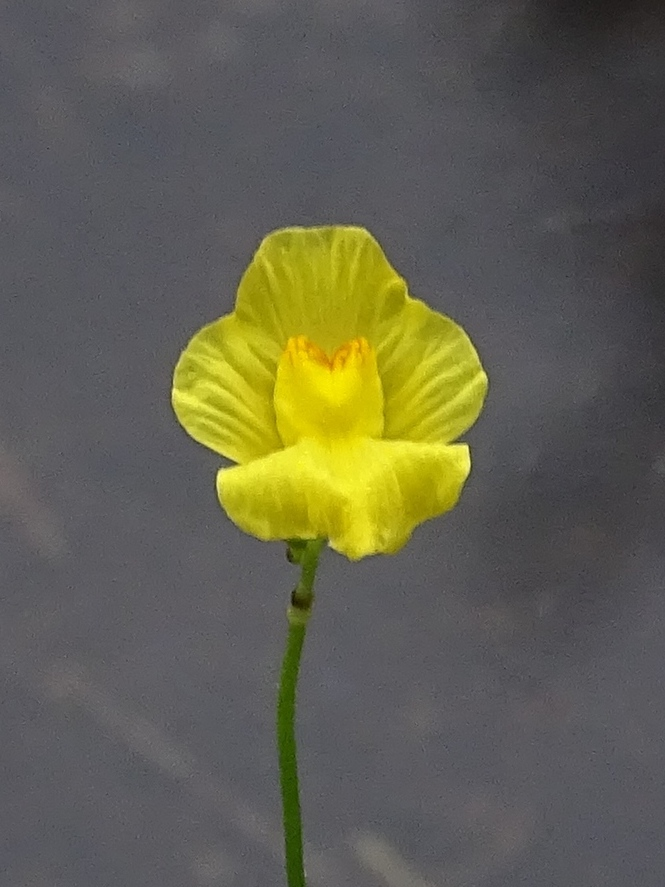

Scientific classification
- Kingdom: Plantae
- Clade: Tracheophytes
- Clade: Angiosperms
- Clade: Eudicots
- Clade: Asterids
- Order: Lamiales
- Family: Lentibulariaceae
- Genus: Utricularia
- Subgenus: Utricularia subg. Utricularia
- Section: Utricularia sect. Utricularia
- Species: U. striata

Binomial name
- Utricularia striata LeConte ex Torr.

Synonyms
- Trilobulina striata (LeConte) Raf.; U. fibrosa Britton; U. gibba subsp. gibba P.Taylor

= Utricularia striata =

Species of carnivorous plant

Utricularia striata, the striped bladderwort, is a medium-sized affixed subaquatic carnivorous plant that belongs to the genus Utricularia. U. striata is endemic to the eastern coastal plains of the United States.

== See also ==
- List of Utricularia species
