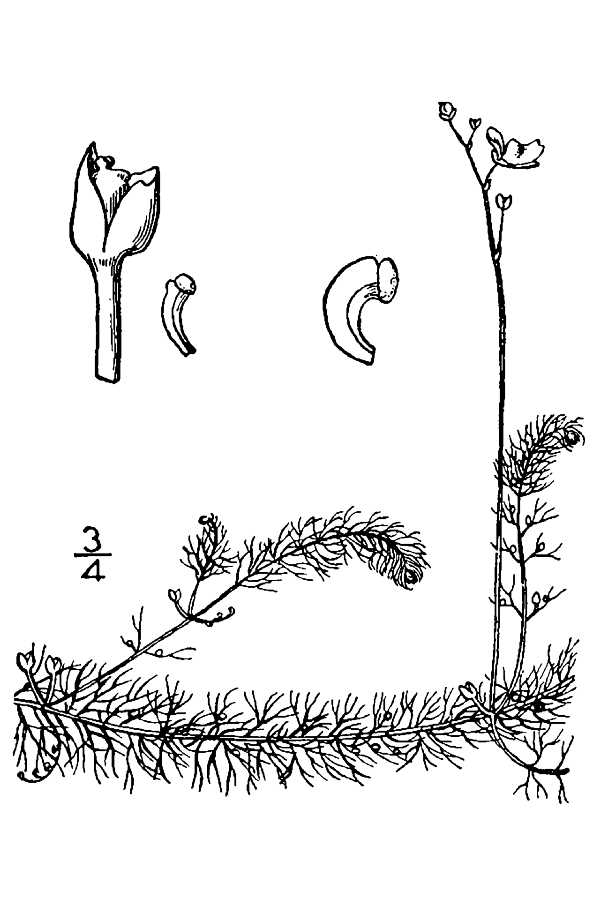

Scientific classification
- Kingdom: Plantae
- Clade: Tracheophytes
- Clade: Angiosperms
- Clade: Eudicots
- Clade: Asterids
- Order: Lamiales
- Family: Lentibulariaceae
- Genus: Utricularia
- Subgenus: Utricularia subg. Utricularia
- Section: Utricularia sect. Utricularia
- Species: U. geminiscapa

Binomial name
- Utricularia geminiscapa Benj. (1847)

Synonyms
- U. clandestina Nutt. ex A.Gray

= Utricularia geminiscapa =

Species of carnivorous plant

Utricularia geminiscapa, the hiddenfruit bladderwort, is a perennial, medium-sized species of aquatic bladderwort. This species occurs naturally in the northeastern United States and Canada with one record from British Columbia in Western Canada. A small population is present near Westport in New Zealand where the species is thought to have recently naturalized–it was first recorded in this area in 1975.

== See also ==
- List of Utricularia species
