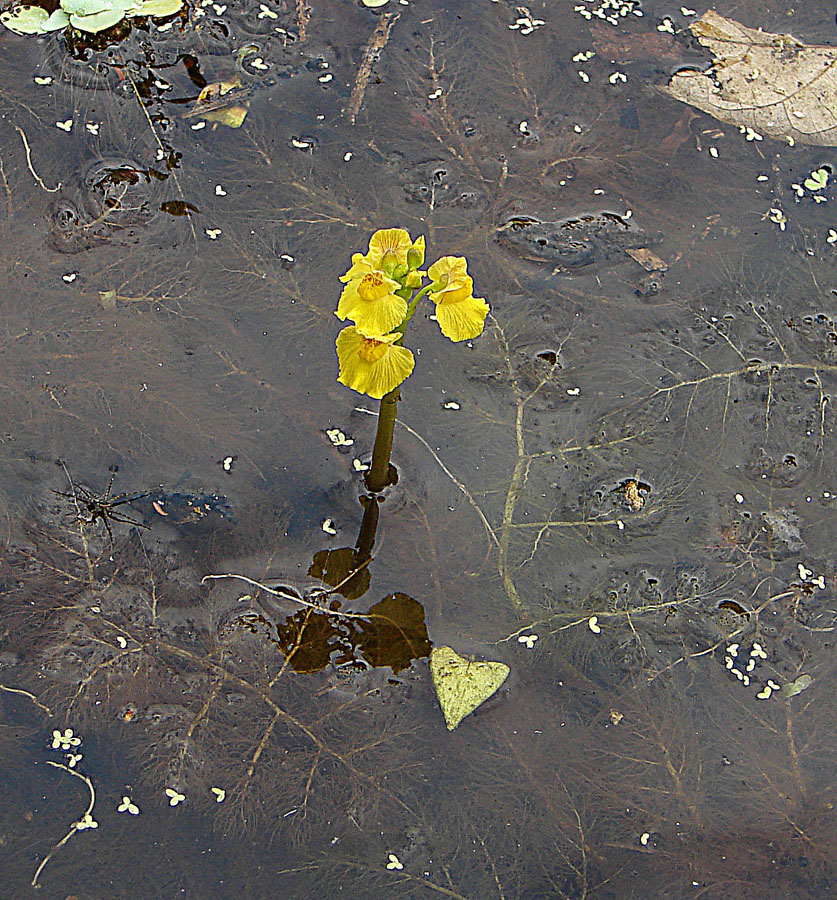

Scientific classification
- Kingdom: Plantae
- Clade: Tracheophytes
- Clade: Angiosperms
- Clade: Eudicots
- Clade: Asterids
- Order: Lamiales
- Family: Lentibulariaceae
- Genus: Utricularia
- Subgenus: Utricularia subg. Utricularia
- Section: Utricularia sect. Utricularia
- Species: U. foliosa

Binomial name
- Utricularia foliosa L.

= Utricularia foliosa =

Species of carnivorous plant

Utricularia foliosa, the leafy bladderwort, is a large suspended aquatic carnivorous plant that belongs to the genus Utricularia (family Lentibulariaceae). It is probably a perennial plant that cultivates in lake, swamps and ponds. U. foliosa is native to Africa and North and South America, widely distributed among many countries. Although, they are widely distributed around the world, very little studies have been contributed to U. foliosa. They like to sprout all year long, and found in large body of water. The environment that Utricularia foliosa are found in are experiencing negative anthropogenic impacts such as drainage and conversion to urban or agricultural activities are causing rapid environmental degradation.

== See also ==
- List of Utricularia species
