= Utricularia floridana =

Scientific classification
- Kingdom: Plantae
- Clade: Tracheophytes
- Clade: Angiosperms
- Clade: Eudicots
- Clade: Asterids
- Order: Lamiales
- Family: Lentibulariaceae
- Genus: Utricularia
- Subgenus: Utricularia subg. Utricularia
- Section: Utricularia sect. Utricularia
- Species: U. floridana

Binomial name
- Utricularia floridana Nash 1896

Species of aquatic plant

Utricularia floridana, the Florida yellow bladderwort, is a large affixed aquatic carnivorous plant in the bladderwort genus within the bladderwort family). It is a perennial plant that is endemic to southeastern United States (Florida, Georgia, Alabama, and the Carolinas).

== See also ==
- List of Utricularia species
