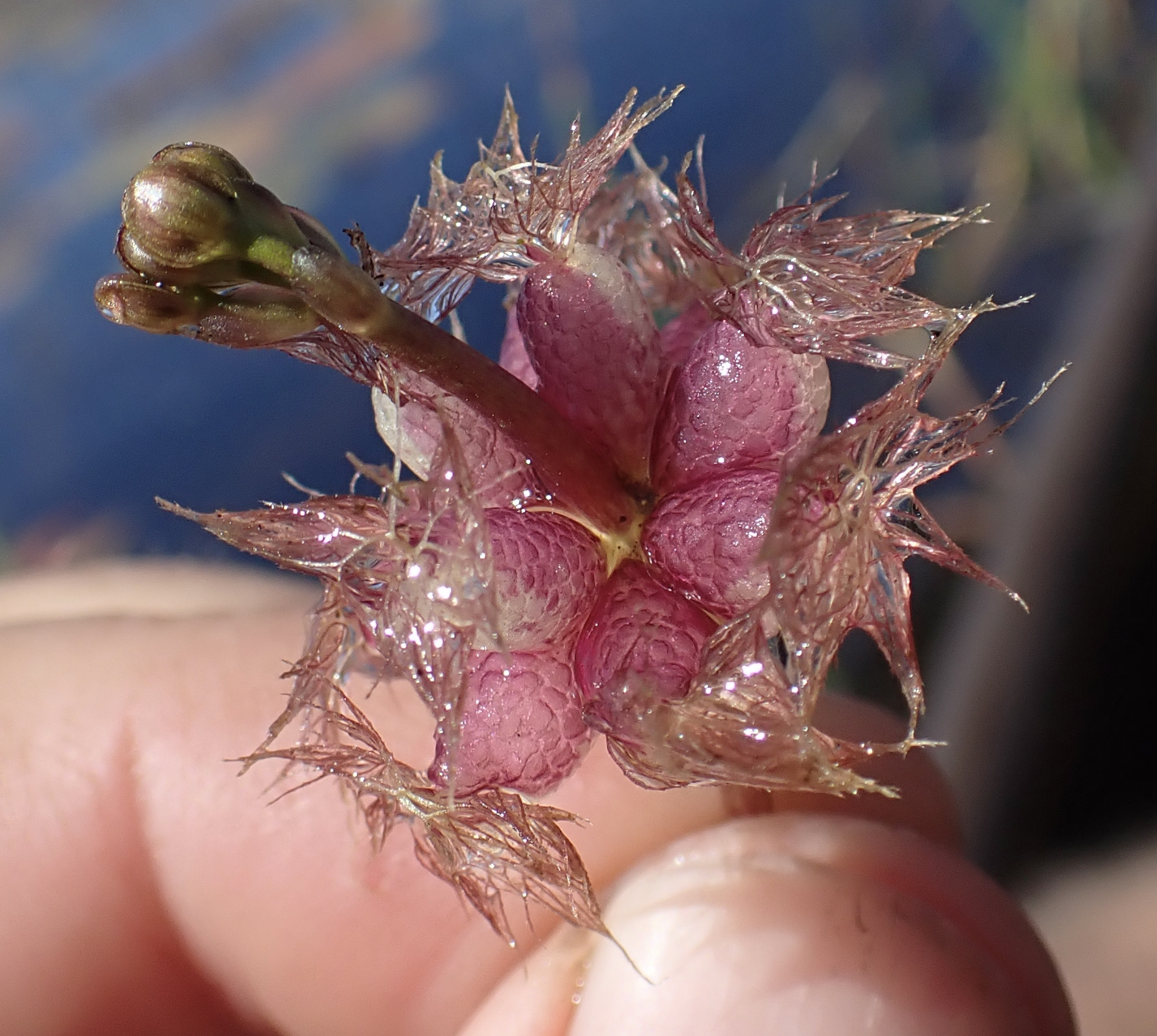

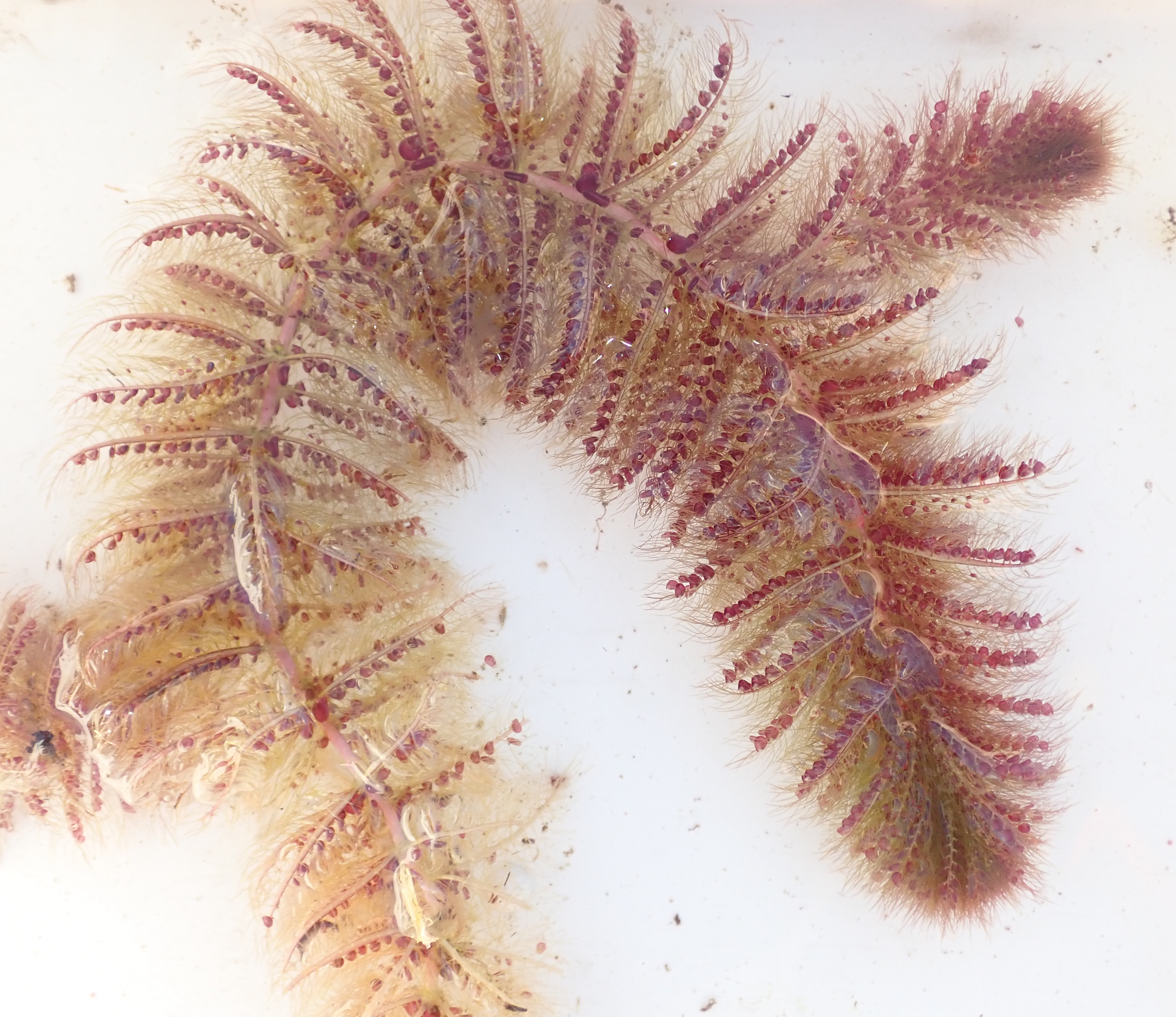

Scientific classification
- Kingdom: Plantae
- Clade: Tracheophytes
- Clade: Angiosperms
- Clade: Eudicots
- Clade: Asterids
- Order: Lamiales
- Family: Lentibulariaceae
- Genus: Utricularia
- Subgenus: Utricularia subg. Utricularia
- Section: Utricularia sect. Utricularia
- Species: U. stellaris

Binomial name
- Utricularia stellaris L.f.

Synonyms
- Hamulia flava Raf.; Lepiactis stellaris (L.f.) Raf.; U. flexuosa var. parviflora Kamiénski; [U. foliosa Kamiénski]; U. inflexa var. stellaris (L.f.) P.Taylor; U. macrocarpa Wall.; [U. muelleri Kamiénski 1902]; U. stellaris var. breviscapa Kamiénski; U. stellaris var. coromandeliana A.DC.; U. stellaris var. dilatata Kamiénski; U. stellaris var. filiformis Kamiénski; U. trichoschiza Stapf

= Utricularia stellaris =

Species of carnivorous plant

Utricularia stellaris is a medium to large sized suspended aquatic carnivorous plant that belongs to the genus Utricularia. U. stellaris is native to Africa, tropical Asia, and northern Australia.

== Gallery ==
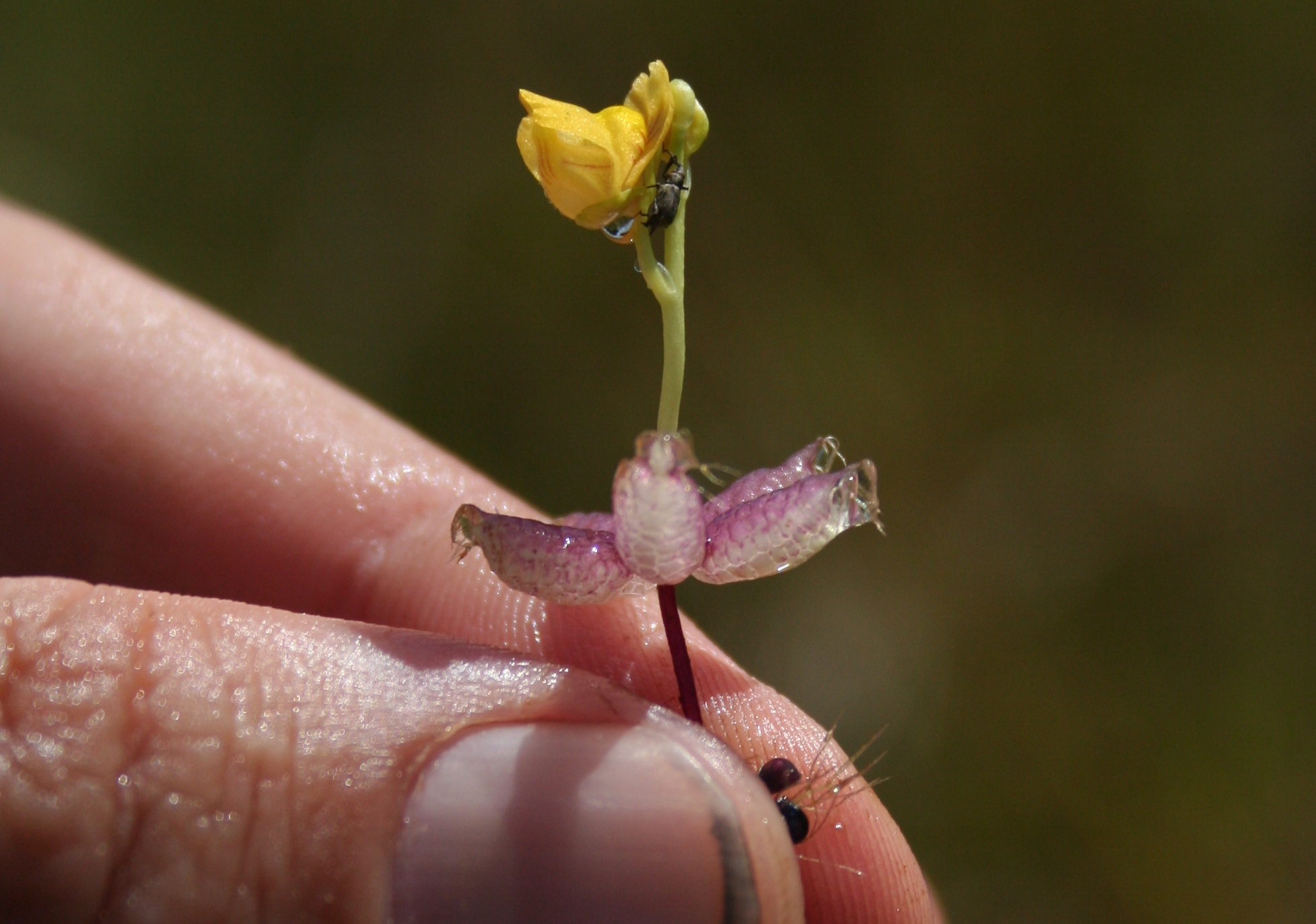

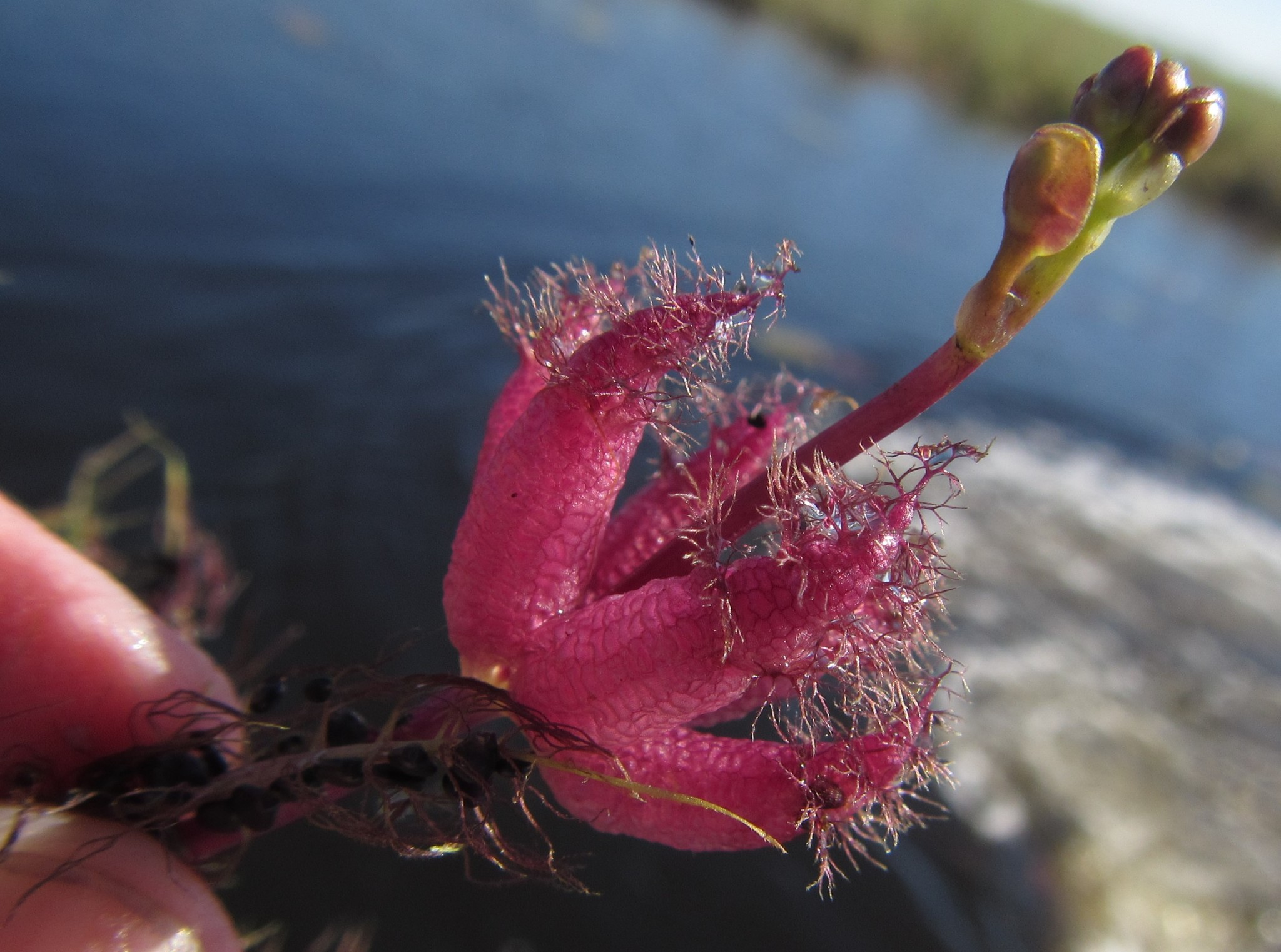

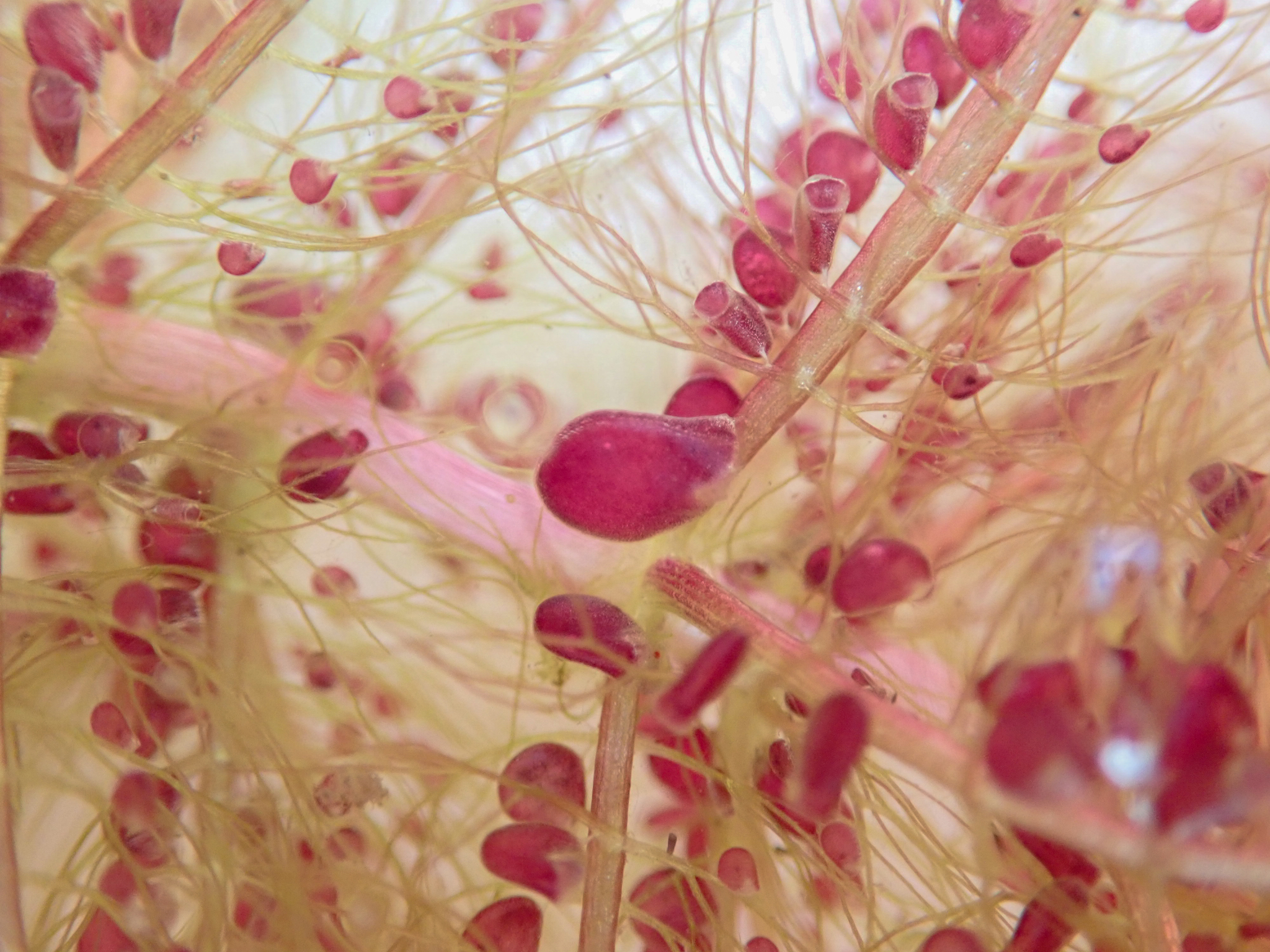

== See also ==
- List of Utricularia species
