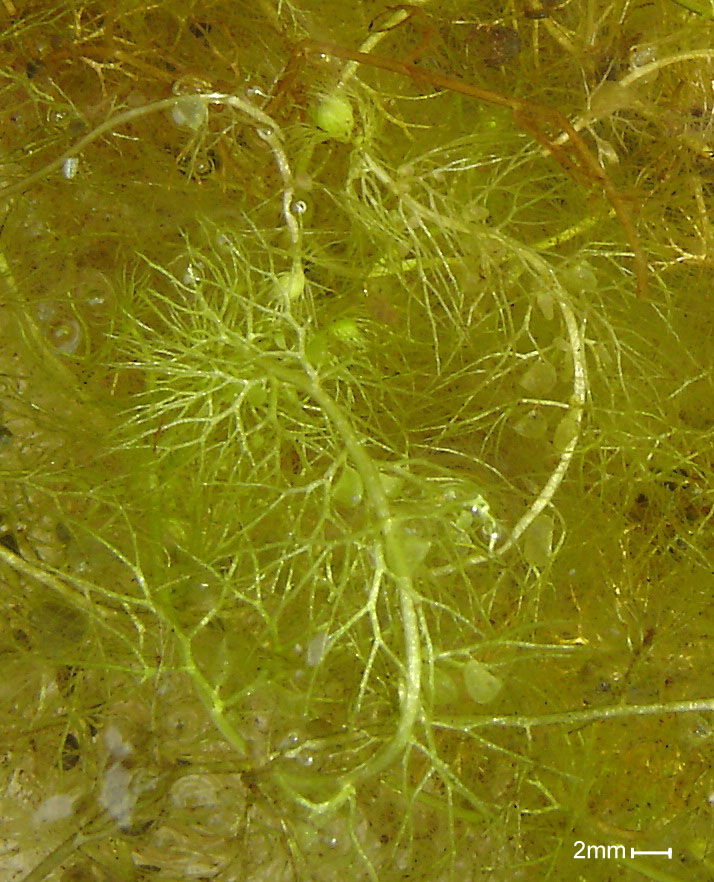

Conservation status
- Least Concern (IUCN 3.1)

Scientific classification
- Kingdom: Plantae
- Clade: Tracheophytes
- Clade: Angiosperms
- Clade: Eudicots
- Clade: Asterids
- Order: Lamiales
- Family: Lentibulariaceae
- Genus: Utricularia
- Subgenus: Utricularia subg. Utricularia
- Section: Utricularia sect. Utricularia
- Species: U. vulgaris

Binomial name
- Utricularia vulgaris L.

Synonyms
- List: Lentibularia major Gilib.; Lentibularia vulgaris (L.) Moench; Urticularia biseriata H. Lindb.; Urticularia officinalis Thornton; Urticularia vulgaris f. brevifolia Kamienski; Urticularia vulgaris f. crassicaulis Kamienski; Urticularia vulgaris f. heterovesicaria Kamienski; Urticularia vulgaris f. magniflora Kamienski; Urticularia vulgaris f. parviflora Kamienski; Urticularia vulgaris f. platyloba Glück; Urticularia vulgaris subsp. major (L.) Ehrh.; Urticularia vulgaris var. platiphylla Hegi; Urticularia vulgaris var. robustior Böckel; Urticularia vulgaris var. typica J. Meister

= Utricularia vulgaris =

Common bladderwort

Species of carnivorous plant

Utricularia vulgaris (greater bladderwort or common bladderwort) is an aquatic species of bladderwort found in Asia and Europe. The plant is free-floating and does not put down roots. Stems can attain lengths of over one metre in a single growing season, but die back and form turions in winter. The leaves are finely pinnately divided, between one and eight centimetres long and carry many bladder-like traps. The yellow flowers are borne on stalks above the surface of the water between April and August. In eastern Asia and North America, its place is taken by the related species U. macrorhiza.

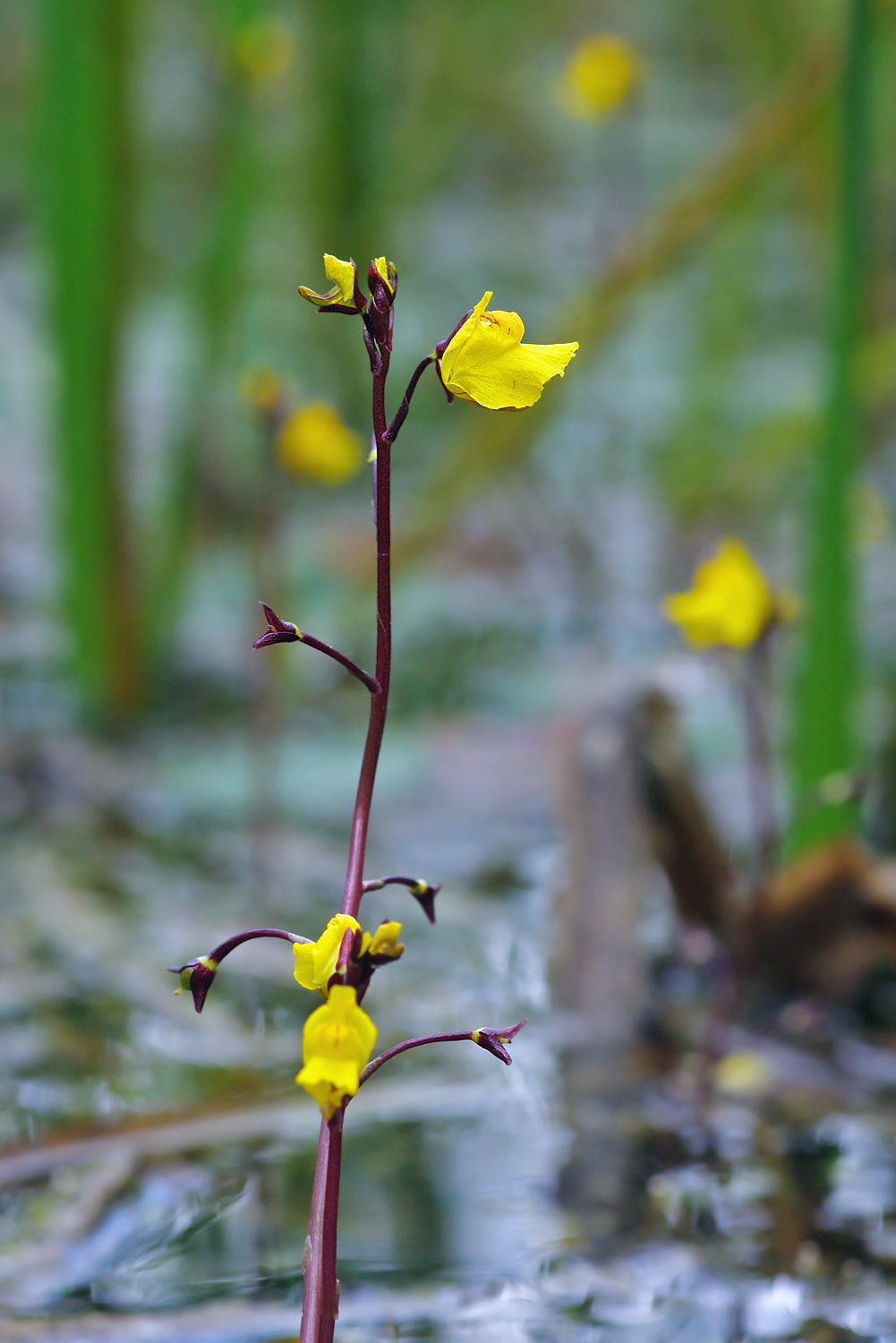
Inflorescence of Utricularia vulgaris
