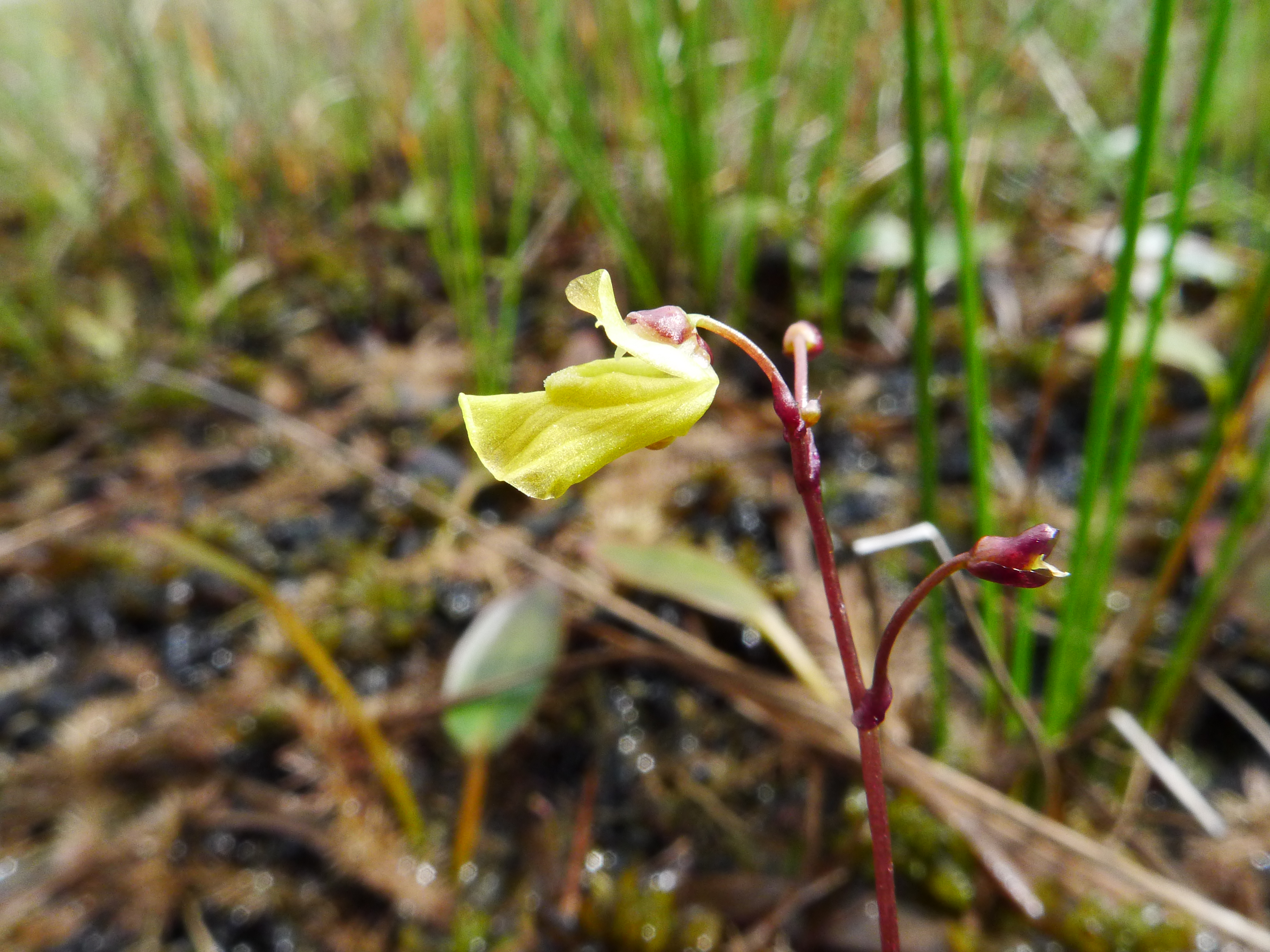

Scientific classification
- Kingdom: Plantae
- Clade: Tracheophytes
- Clade: Angiosperms
- Clade: Eudicots
- Clade: Asterids
- Order: Lamiales
- Family: Lentibulariaceae
- Genus: Utricularia
- Subgenus: Utricularia subg. Utricularia
- Section: Utricularia sect. Utricularia
- Species: U. ochroleuca

Binomial name
- Utricularia ochroleuca R.W.Hartm.

Synonyms
- U. brevicornis Celak.; U. dubia ochroleuca E.H.L.Krause nom. illeg.; U. intermedia × U. minor Neuman; U. intermedia f. ochroleuca (R.W.Hartm.) Komiya; U. occidentalis A.Gray; U. × litoralis Melander

= Utricularia ochroleuca =

Species of carnivorous plant

Utricularia ochroleuca, the yellowishwhite bladderwort, pale bladderwort, or cream-flowered bladderwort, is a small, perennial carnivorous plant that belongs to the genus Utricularia. It is usually found affixed to the substrate. U. ochroleuca is a circumboreal species and is found in North America, Asia, and Europe.

== See also ==
- List of Utricularia species
