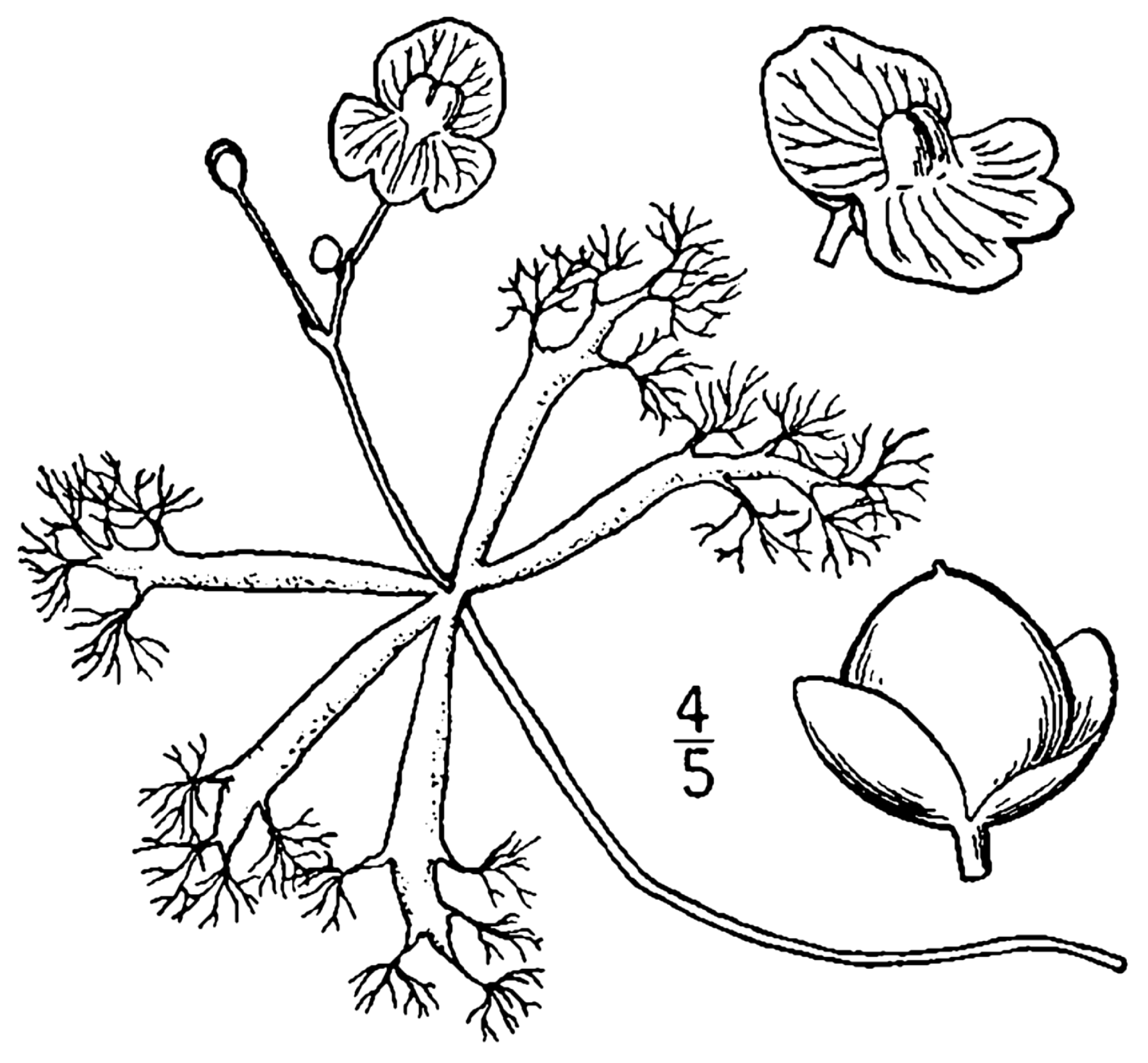
- Illustration of U. radiata from 1913.

Scientific classification
- Kingdom: Plantae
- Clade: Tracheophytes
- Clade: Angiosperms
- Clade: Eudicots
- Clade: Asterids
- Order: Lamiales
- Family: Lentibulariaceae
- Genus: Utricularia
- Subgenus: Utricularia subg. Utricularia
- Section: Utricularia sect. Utricularia
- Species: U. radiata

Binomial name
- Utricularia radiata Small

Synonyms
- U. inflata var. minor Chapm.; U. inflata var. radiata (Small) Stone

= Utricularia radiata =

Species of carnivorous plant

Utricularia radiata, the little floating bladderwort or small swollen bladderwort, is a medium-sized suspended aquatic carnivorous plant that belongs to the genus Utricularia. U. radiata is endemic to North America.

The size of U. radiata ranges from 0 to 30.5 centimeters (approximately 0 to 1 foot) in height. It is most commonly found in habitats such as lakes, ponds, and ditches. This species has the ability to prey upon a variety of both phytoplankton and zooplankton.

== See also ==
- List of Utricularia species
