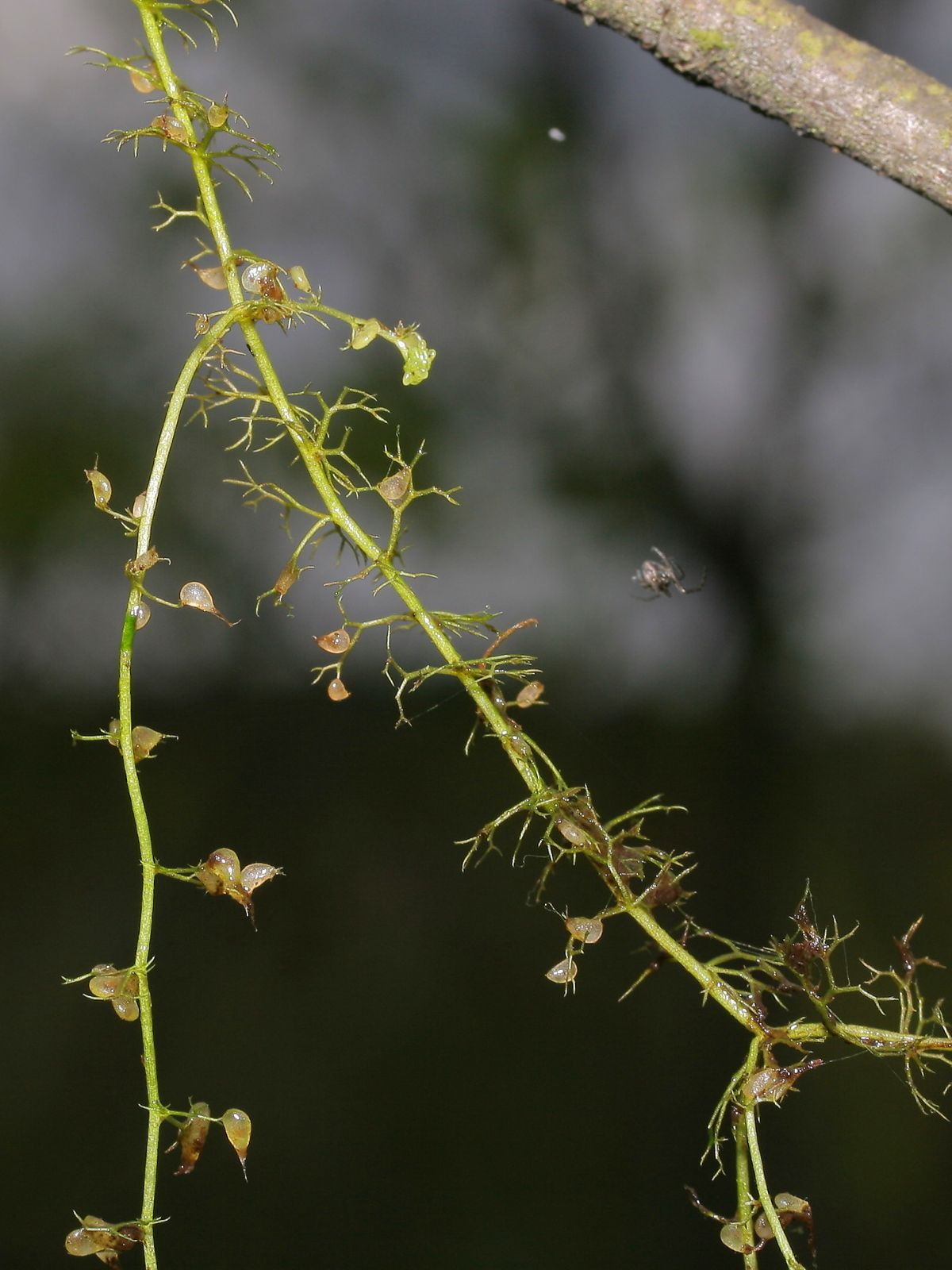

Conservation status
- Least Concern (IUCN 3.1)

Scientific classification
- Kingdom: Plantae
- Clade: Tracheophytes
- Clade: Angiosperms
- Clade: Eudicots
- Clade: Asterids
- Order: Lamiales
- Family: Lentibulariaceae
- Genus: Utricularia
- Subgenus: Utricularia subg. Utricularia
- Section: Utricularia sect. Utricularia
- Species: U. minor

Binomial name
- Utricularia minor L.

Synonyms
- List: Lentibularia minor (L.) Raf.; Utricularia minor f. natans Komiya; Utricularia minor var. platyloba J.Meister; Utricularia minor f. platyloba (J.Meister) Glück; Utricularia minor f. stricta Komiya; Utricularia minor f. terrestris Glück; Utricularia nepalensis Kitam.; Utricularia rogersiana Lace

= Utricularia minor =

Species of carnivorous plant

Utricularia minor, the lesser bladderwort, is a small species of perennial carnivorous plant in the family Lentibulariaceae. It is usually found affixed to the substrate but it can also survive suspended in a body of water. U. minor is a circumboreal species and is found in North America, Asia, and Europe. Unique among plants and according to the USDA, U. minor is the only plant that is both resistant to fire and also has a high tolerance to it.

== See also ==
- List of Utricularia species
