= List of Pinguicula species =

The genus Pinguicula contains the 126 species of butterworts, belonging to the bladderwort family (Lentibulariaceae). Species are distributed across the subarctic and temperate Northern Hemisphere, in the tropical Americas from Mexico to Bolivia, and to southern Argentina and central and southern Chile. Over half of the species are concentrated in Mexico and Central America.

== Accepted species ==
126 species are currently accepted by Plants of the World Online.

- Pinguicula acuminata Benth.
- Pinguicula agnata Casper
- Pinguicula albida C.Wright ex Griseb.
- Pinguicula algida Malyschev
- Pinguicula alpina L.
- Pinguicula antarctica Vahl
- Pinguicula apuana Casper & Ansaldi
- Pinguicula arvetii P.A.Genty
- Pinguicula australandina Gluch
- Pinguicula baezensis Casper
- Pinguicula balcanica Casper
- Pinguicula benedicta Barnhart
- Pinguicula bissei Casper
- Pinguicula bustamanta Zamudio & Nevárez
- Pinguicula caerulea Walter
- Pinguicula calderoniae Zamudio
- Pinguicula calyptrata Kunth
- Pinguicula caryophyllacea Casper
- Pinguicula casabitoana J.Jiménez Alm.
- Pinguicula casperi H.D.Juárez & Zamudio
- Pinguicula casperiana M.B.Crespo, Mart.-Azorín, M.Á.Alonso & L.Sáez
- Pinguicula caussensis (Casper) Roccia
- Pinguicula chilensis Clos
- Pinguicula christinae Peruzzi & Gestri
- Pinguicula colimensis McVaugh & Mickel
- Pinguicula conzattii Zamudio & van Marm
- Pinguicula corsica Bernard & Gren.
- Pinguicula crassifolia Zamudio
- Pinguicula crenatiloba A.DC.
- Pinguicula crystallina Sm.
- Pinguicula cubensis Urquiola & Casper
- Pinguicula cyclosecta Casper
- Pinguicula debbertiana Speta & F.Fuchs
- Pinguicula dertosensis (Cañig.) Mateo & M.B.Crespo
- Pinguicula ehlersiae Speta & F.Fuchs
- Pinguicula elizabethiae Zamudio
- Pinguicula elongata Benj.
- Pinguicula emarginata S.Z.Ruiz & Rzed.
- Pinguicula esseriana B.Kirchn.
- Pinguicula filifolia C.Wright ex Griseb.
- Pinguicula fiorii Tammaro & Pace
- Pinguicula fontiqueriana Romo, Peris & Stübing
- Pinguicula gigantea Luhrs
- Pinguicula gongshanensis J.Sun ter, Y.L.Wen & R.Li
- Pinguicula gracilis Zamudio
- Pinguicula grandiflora Lam.
- Pinguicula greenwoodii Cheek
- Pinguicula gypsicola Brandegee
- Pinguicula habilii Yıldırım, Senol & Pirhan
- Pinguicula hemiepiphytica Zamudio & Rzed.
- Pinguicula heterophylla Benth.
- Pinguicula hirtiflora Ten.
- Pinguicula hondurensis Zamudio & H.Vega
- Pinguicula × hybrida Wettst.
- Pinguicula ibarrae Zamudio
- Pinguicula imitatrix Casper
- Pinguicula immaculata Zamudio & Lux
- Pinguicula infundibuliformis Casper
- Pinguicula involuta Ruiz & Pav.
- Pinguicula ionantha R.K.Godfrey
- Pinguicula jackii Barnhart
- Pinguicula jaraguana Casper
- Pinguicula jarmilae Halda & Malina
- Pinguicula jaumavensis Debbert
- Pinguicula jimburensis Á.J.Pérez, Tobar & T.Henning
- Pinguicula kondoi Casper
- Pinguicula lattanziae Peruzzi & Gestri
- Pinguicula laueana Speta & F.Fuchs
- Pinguicula lavalvae Innangi & Izzo
- Pinguicula laxifolia Luhrs
- Pinguicula leptoceras Rchb.
- Pinguicula lignicola Barnhart
- Pinguicula lilacina Schltdl. & Cham.
- Pinguicula lippoldii Casper
- Pinguicula lithophytica Panfet & P.Temple
- Pinguicula longifolia Ramond ex DC.
- Pinguicula lusitanica L.
- Pinguicula lutea Walter
- Pinguicula macroceras Pall. ex Link
- Pinguicula macrophylla Kunth
- Pinguicula mariae Casper
- Pinguicula martinezii Zamudio
- Pinguicula medusina Zamudio & Studnicka
- Pinguicula mesophytica Zamudio
- Pinguicula michoacana Zamudio & H.D.Juárez
- Pinguicula mirandae Zamudio & Salinas
- Pinguicula moaensis Casper
- Pinguicula moctezumae Zamudio & R.Z.Ortega
- Pinguicula moranensis Kunth
- Pinguicula mundi Blanca, Jamilena, Ruíz Rejón & Reg.Zamora
- Pinguicula nahuelbutensis Gluch
- Pinguicula nevadensis (H.Lindb.) Casper
- Pinguicula nivalis Luhrs & Lampard
- Pinguicula oblongiloba A.DC.
- Pinguicula olmeca Zamudio, Burelo & Gonz.-Aguilar
- Pinguicula ombrophila Á.J.Pérez, Tobar & T.Henning
- Pinguicula orchidioides A.DC.
- Pinguicula orthoceras Casper
- Pinguicula parvifolia B.L.Rob.
- Pinguicula pilosa Luhrs, Studnicka & Gluch
- Pinguicula planifolia Chapm.
- Pinguicula poldinii J.Steiger & Casper
- Pinguicula primuliflora C.E.Wood & R.K.Godfrey
- Pinguicula pumila Michx.
- Pinguicula pygmaea Rivadavia, E.L.Read & A.Fleischm.
- Pinguicula ramosa Miyoshi ex Yatabe
- Pinguicula reichenbachiana J.Schindl.
- Pinguicula reticulata Schlauer
- Pinguicula robertiana Zamudio & Hern.Rend.
- Pinguicula rosmariae Casper, Bussmann & T.Henning
- Pinguicula rotundiflora Studnicka
- Pinguicula rzedowskiana Zamudio & H.D.Juárez
- Pinguicula saetabensis M.B.Crespo, Mart.-Azorín & M.Á.Alonso
- Pinguicula × scullyi Druce
- Pinguicula sehuensis Bacch., Cannas & Peruzzi
- Pinguicula sharpii Casper & K.Kondo
- Pinguicula simulans Zamudio, M.M.Salinas, Hern.Rend. & Quirino
- Pinguicula spathulata Ledeb.
- Pinguicula takakii S.Z.Ruiz & Rzed.
- Pinguicula tejedensis M.B.Crespo, Mart.-Azorín, M.Á.Alonso & L.Sáez
- Pinguicula utricularioides Zamudio & Rzed.
- Pinguicula vallis-regiae F.Conti & Peruzzi
- Pinguicula vallisneriifolia Webb
- Pinguicula villosa L.
- Pinguicula vulgaris L.
- Pinguicula warijia Zamudio, Hern.Rend., Mata-Rosas & M.M.Salinas
- Pinguicula zamudioana H.D.Juárez & Muñiz-Castro
- Pinguicula zecheri Speta & F.Fuchs

== Casper's subgeneric classification ==
Siegfried Jost Casper systematically divided them into three subgenera with 15 sections. Subsequent phylogenetic research showed that many of these groupings are polyphyletic, but they are used below.

=== Subgenus Isoloba ===
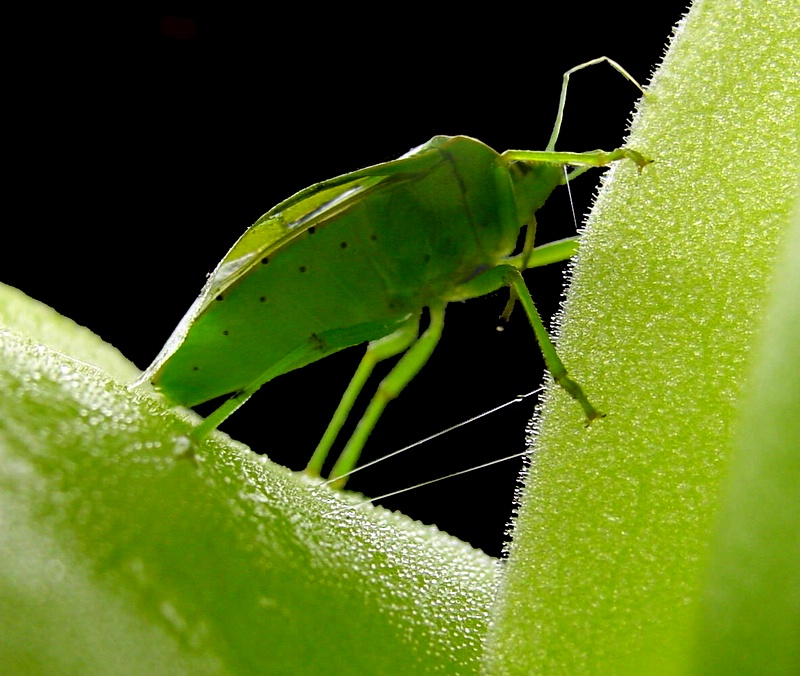
Pinguicula gigantea with prey. The insect was too large and was able to escape.

==== Section Agnata ====
- Pinguicula agnata
- Pinguicula albida
- Pinguicula benedicta
- Pinguicula cubensis
- Pinguicula filifolia
- Pinguicula gigantea
- Pinguicula infundibuliformis
- Pinguicula lithophytica
- Pinguicula pilosa

==== Section Cardiophyllum ====
- Pinguicula crystallina
- Pinguicula hirtiflora
- Pinguicula habilii

==== Section Discoradix ====
- Pinguicula casabitoana
- Pinguicula lignicola

==== Section Heterophyllum ====
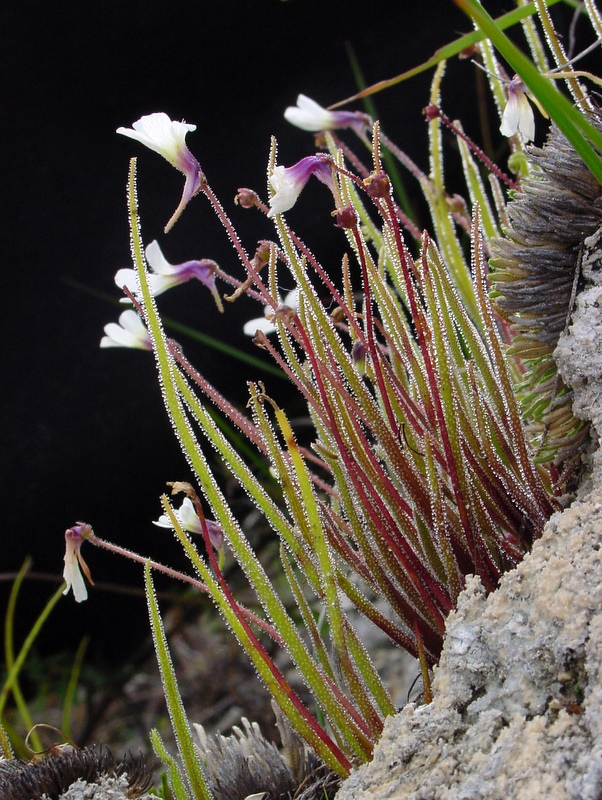
Pinguicula heterophylla

- Pinguicula acuminata
- Pinguicula conzattii
- Pinguicula heterophylla
- Pinguicula imitatrix
- Pinguicula kondoi
- Pinguicula mirandae
- Pinguicula parvifolia
- Pinguicula rotundiflora

==== Section Isoloba ====
- Pinguicula caerulea – blue-flower butterwort
- Pinguicula ionantha – Godfrey's butterwort, violet butterwort
- Pinguicula lilacina
- Pinguicula lusitanica – pale butterwort
- Pinguicula lutea – yellow butterwort
- Pinguicula planifolia – Chapman's butterwort
- Pinguicula primuliflora – southern butterwort
- Pinguicula pumila – small butterwort
- Pinguicula sharpii
- Pinguicula takakii

=== Subgenus Pinguicula ===
==== Section Crassifolia ====
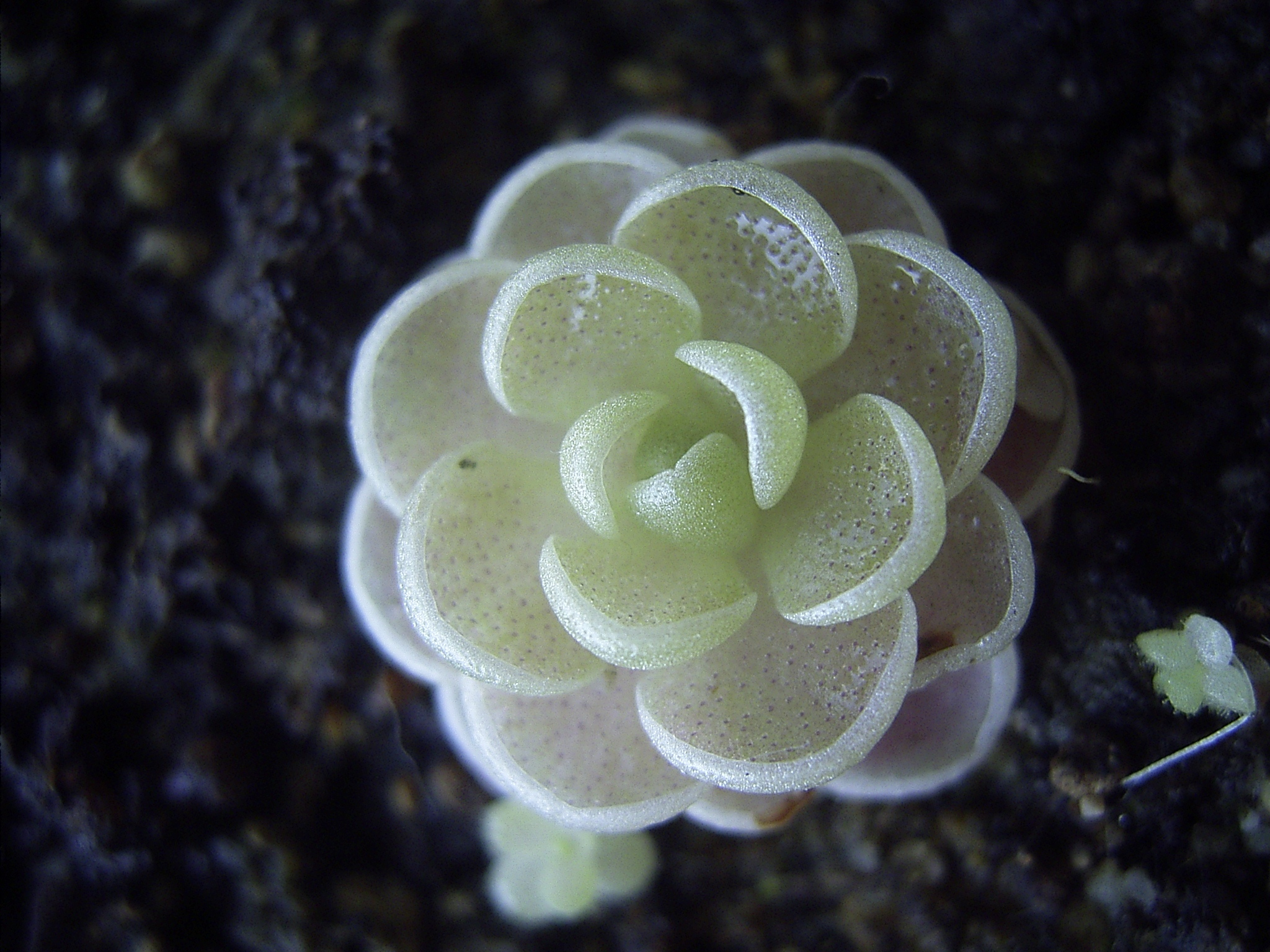
Pinguicula esseriana

- Pinguicula ehlersiae
- Pinguicula esseriana
- Pinguicula debbertiana
- Pinguicula jaumavensis

==== Section Homophyllum ====
- Pinguicula greenwoodii
- Pinguicula jackii
- Pinguicula lippoldii
- Pinguicula caryophyllacea

==== Section Longitubus ====
- Pinguicula calderoniae
- Pinguicula crassifolia
- Pinguicula hemiepiphytica
- Pinguicula laueana
- Pinguicula utricularioides

==== Section Nana ====
- Pinguicula villosa – hairy butterwort

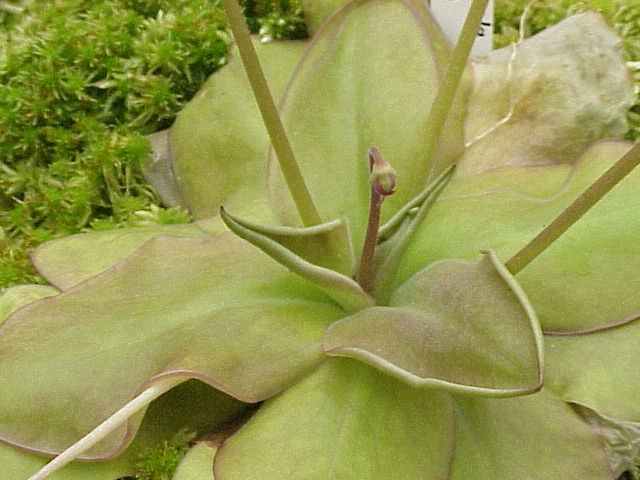
Pinguicula moranensis

==== Section Orcheosanthus ====
- Pinguicula colimensis
- Pinguicula cyclosecta
- Pinguicula elizabethiae
- Pinguicula gypsicola
- Pinguicula macrophylla
- Pinguicula mesophytica
- Pinguicula moctezumae
- Pinguicula moranensis
- Pinguicula oblongiloba
- Pinguicula orchidioides (synonym P. stolonifera)
- Pinguicula zecheri

==== Section Orchidioides ====
- Pinguicula laxifolia

==== Section Pinguicula ====
- Pinguicula balcanica – Balkanian butterwort
  - Pinguicula balcanica var. tenuilaciniata
- Pinguicula corsica
- Pinguicula grandiflora – large-flowered butterwort
  - Pinguicula grandiflora subsp. rosea
- Pinguicula leptoceras
- Pinguicula longifolia – long-leaved butterwort
  - Pinguicula longifolia causensis
  - Pinguicula longifolia dertosensis
  - Pinguicula longifolia reichenbachiana
- Pinguicula macroceras – California butterwort
  - Pinguicula macroceras var. macroceras
  - Pinguicula macroceras nortensis
- Pinguicula mundi
- Pinguicula nevadensis
- Pinguicula poldinii
- Pinguicula vallisneriifolia
- Pinguicula vulgaris – common butterwort

=== Subgenus Temnoceras ===
==== Section Ampullipalatum ====
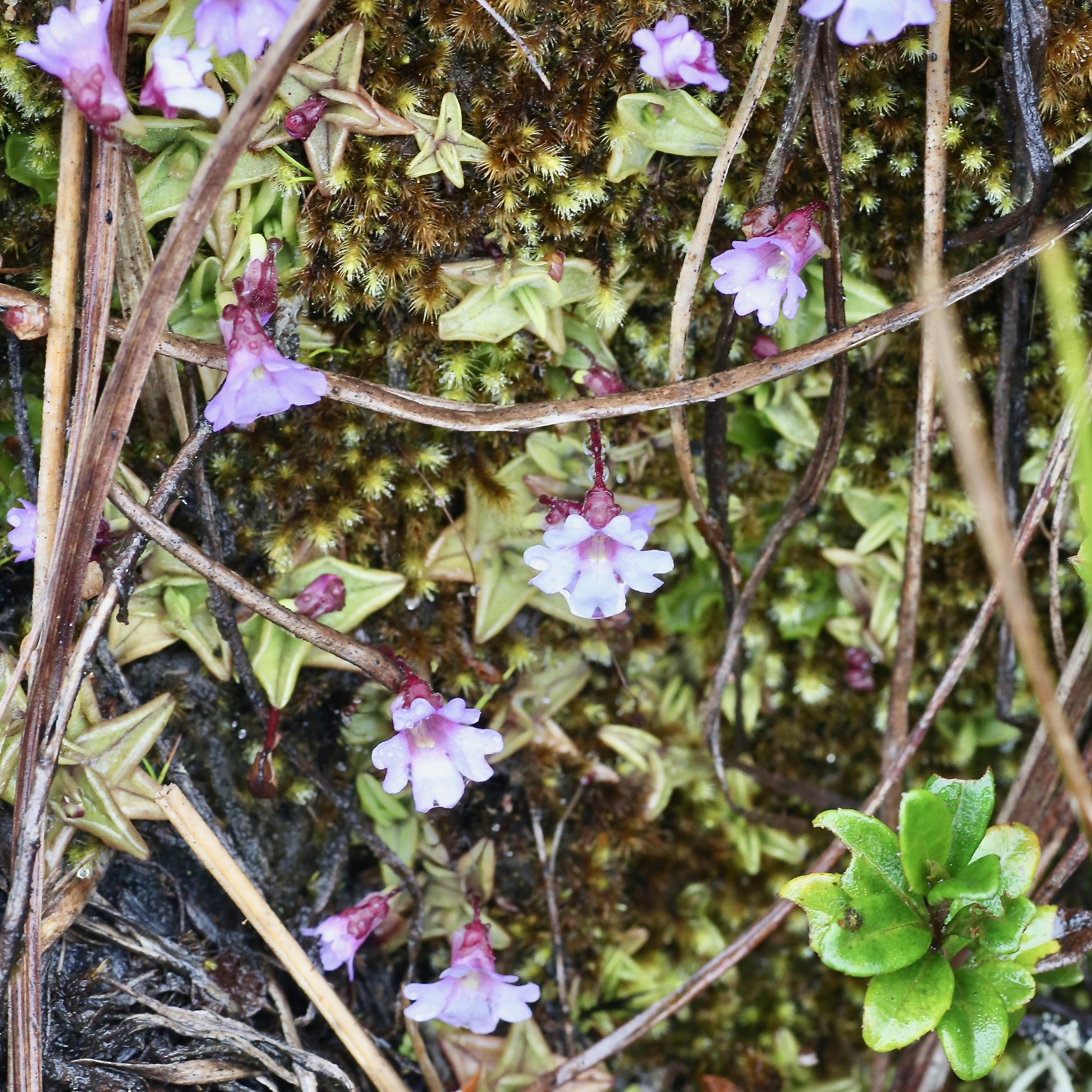
Pinguicula calyptrata from Ecuador, Cayambe Coca National Park, 3800 m

- Pinguicula antarctica
- Pinguicula calyptrata
- Pinguicula chilensis
- Pinguicula involuta
- Pinguicula jimburensis
- Pinguicula elongata
- Pinguicula ombrophilia

==== Section Micranthus ====
- Pinguicula algida
- Pinguicula alpina – Alpine butterwort
- Pinguicula ramosa
- Pinguicula variegata

==== Section Temnoceras ====
- Pinguicula clivorum
- Pinguicula crenatiloba
- Pinguicula emarginata
- Pinguicula gracilis
- Pinguicula immaculata

=== Incertae sedis ===
- Pinguicula chuquisacensis

== References, external links, and further reading ==
- Casper, S. J.: Monographie der Gattung Pinguicula, (Bibliotheca Botanica, Heft 127/128), 1966, Stuttgart
- Cieslak, Thomas; Polepalli, Jai Santosh; White, Adam; Müller, Kai; Borsch, Thomas; Barthlott, Wilhelm; Steiger, Juerg; Marchant, Adam; Legendre, Laurent (2005). "Phylogenetic analysis of 'Pinguicula (Lentibulariaceae): chloroplast DNA sequences and morphology support several geographically distinct radiations". American Journal of Botany. 92 (10): 1723–1736. doi:10.3732/ajb.92.10.1723. PMID 21646090.
- Schlauer, Jan: Carnivorous Plant Database Archived 2016-09-18 at the Wayback Machine, version Nov. 15, 16:25.
