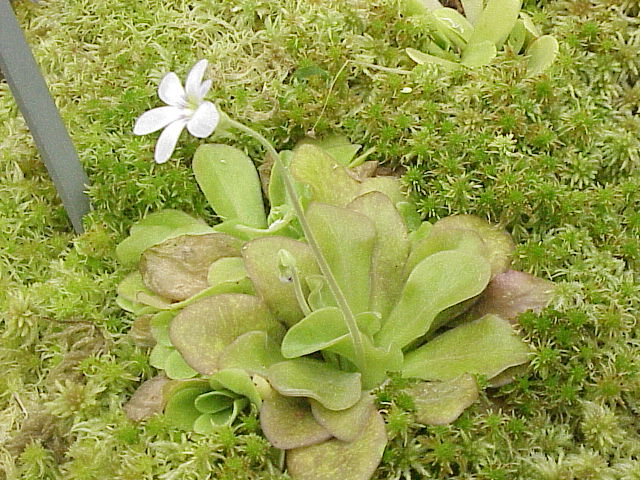

Scientific classification
- Kingdom: Plantae
- Clade: Embryophytes
- Clade: Tracheophytes
- Clade: Angiosperms
- Clade: Eudicots
- Clade: Asterids
- Order: Lamiales
- Family: Lentibulariaceae
- Genus: Pinguicula
- Species: P. agnata

Binomial name
- Pinguicula agnata Casper

= Pinguicula agnata =

Species of flowering plant

Pinguicula agnata is a subtropical, perennial, carnivorous species of plant in the family Lentibulariaceae.

== Description ==
The flowers of Pinguicula agnata bloom during late spring. They are zygomorphic and their color ranges from violet to white. They possess edible trichomes that function as rewards for the pollinators that visit them.

The plant is heterophyllous, meaning it has two sets of leaves. It alternates between succulent, non‐carnivorous winter leaves (7.5–30 mm) with non‐glandular hairs and larger, succulent carnivorous summer leaves (35–80 mm) lined with stiff bristles which capture unsuspecting prey upon contact.

== Distribution and habitat ==
Pinguicula agnata is native to northeastern Mexico. Endemic to humid pine forests, this species was the first carnivorous plant species to be known to perform crassulacean acid metabolism (CAM), an adatation of photosynthesis to arid climate. Its succulent leaves retain moisture during the dry season.

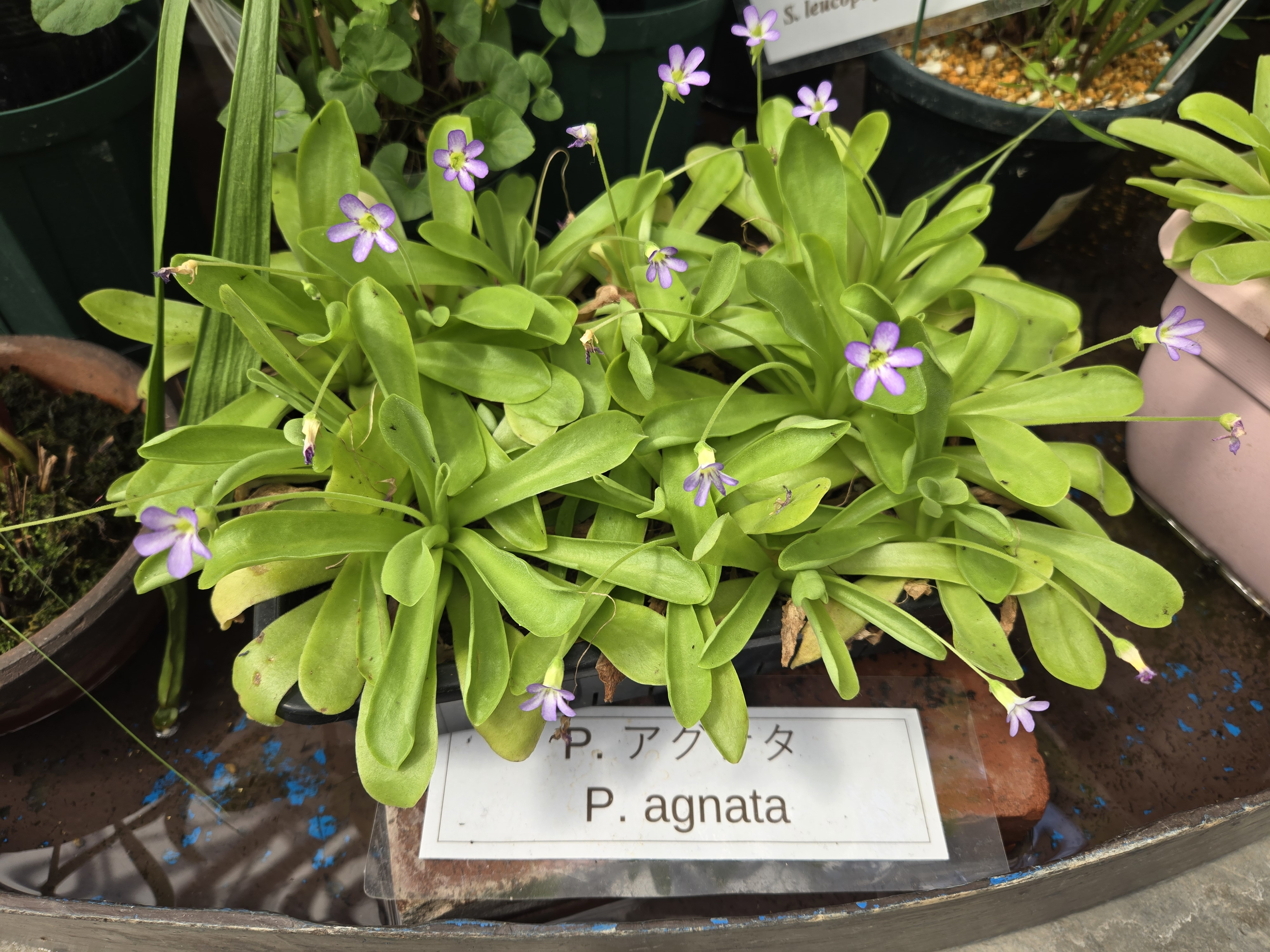
A flowering group of P. agnata.
