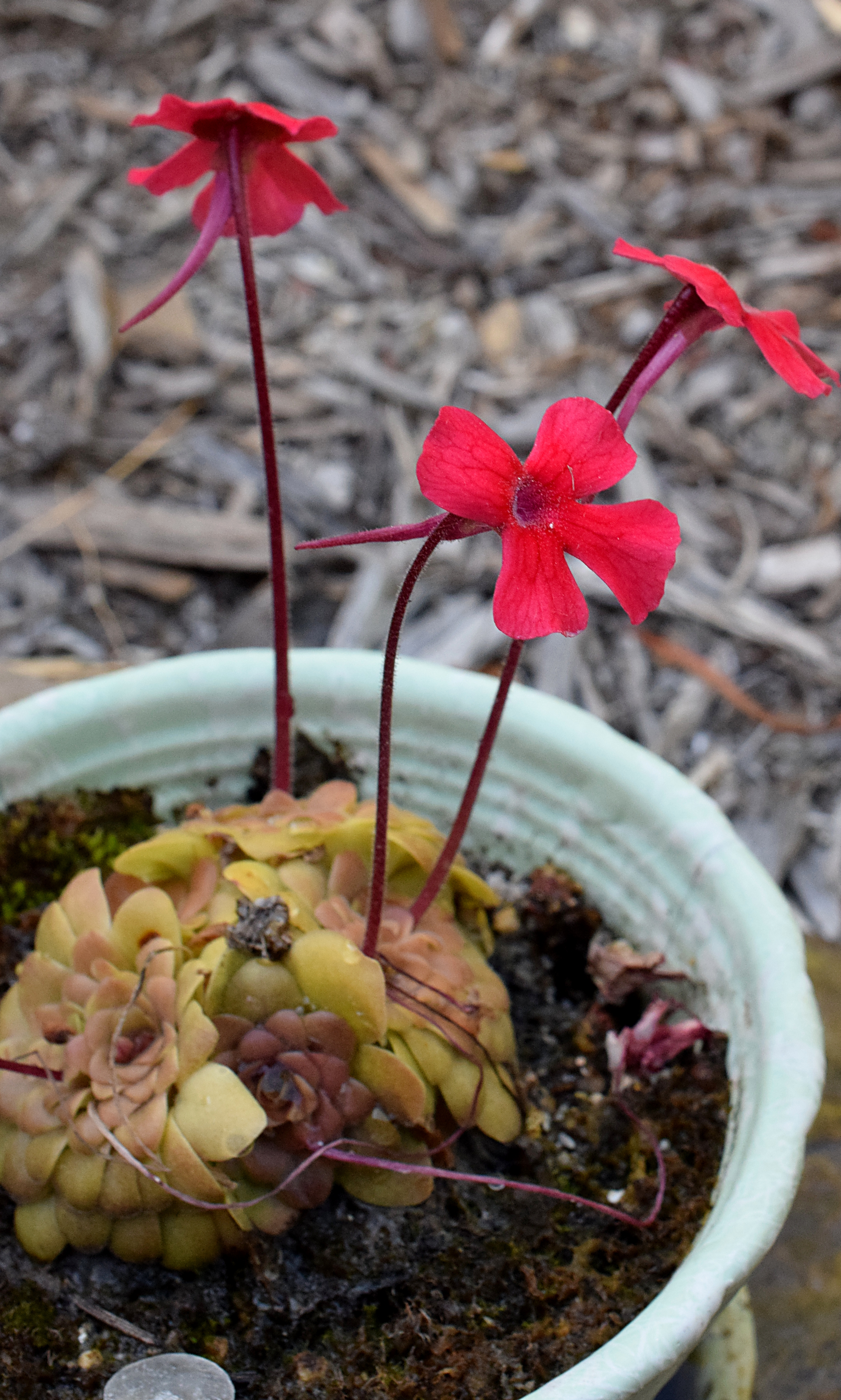
- Flowering Pinguicula laueana in cultivation

Scientific classification
- Kingdom: Plantae
- Clade: Tracheophytes
- Clade: Angiosperms
- Clade: Eudicots
- Clade: Asterids
- Order: Lamiales
- Family: Lentibulariaceae
- Genus: Pinguicula
- Species: P. laueana

Binomial name
- Pinguicula laueana Speta & F.Fuchs

= Pinguicula laueana =

Species of carnivorous plant

Pinguicula laueana is a perennial rosette-forming insectivorous plant native to the state of Oaxaca in Mexico. It is one of only two species of butterwort known to have a red flower, the other being P. caryophyllacea. As Pinguicula lauana it has gained the Royal Horticultural Society's Award of Garden Merit.
