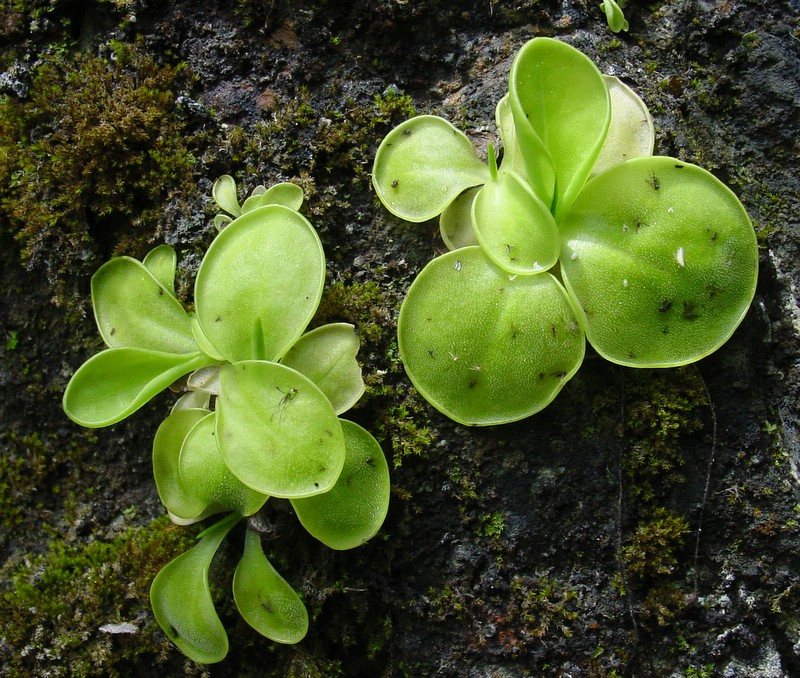
- In situ

Scientific classification
- Kingdom: Plantae
- Clade: Tracheophytes
- Clade: Angiosperms
- Clade: Eudicots
- Clade: Asterids
- Order: Lamiales
- Family: Lentibulariaceae
- Genus: Pinguicula
- Species: P. conzattii

Binomial name
- Pinguicula conzattii Zamudio Ruiz & van Marm, 2003
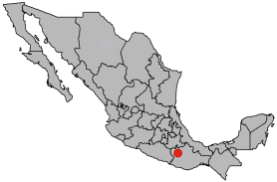
- Species distribution

= Pinguicula conzattii =

Species of carnivorous plant

Pinguicula conzattii is an insectivorous plant of the genus Pinguicula native to the Mexican state of Oaxaca, a member of the section Heterophyllum. Closely related to Pinguicula mirandae, it is notable for being pubescent on both sides of its winter leaves. It is named in honour of Cassiano Conzatti, an Italian-born botanist who spent most of his life in Mexico.

== Morphology ==
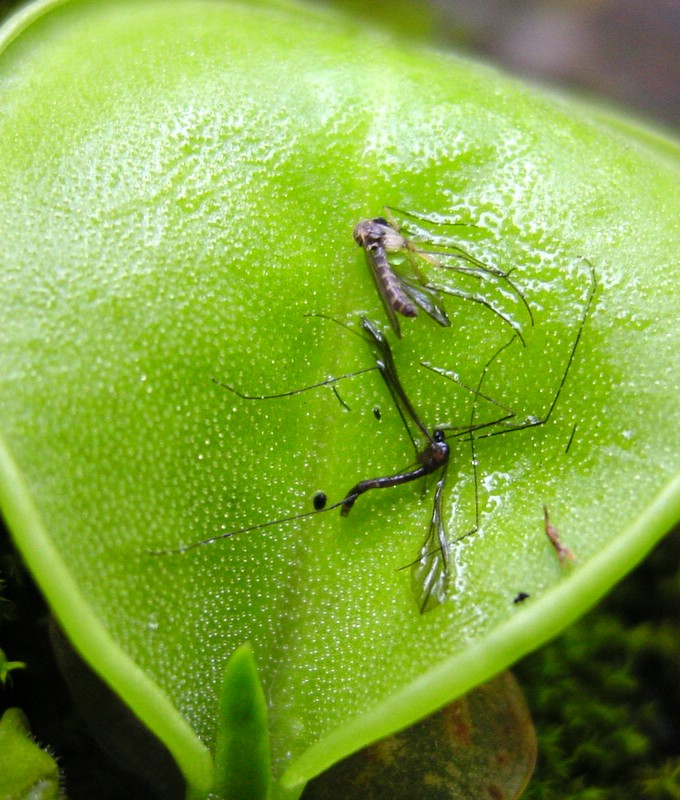
P. conzattii with prey

Pinguicula conzattii is a perennial rosetted herb bearing stiff, ground-hugging rotund 28–50 mm. (1-2 in) long leaves borne on 10–20 mm (3/8–7/8 in) petioles. These are densely covered with stalked mucilaginous and sessile digestive glands, which serve to trap and digest insect prey and absorb the resulting nutrient mixture to supplement their nitrate-low environment. During dryer winter conditions when food is scarce, P. conzattii forms winter rosettes of short, non-carnivorous leaves to decrease the loss of energy used on carnivorous mechanisms, showing clearly the cost of carnivory.

The flowers are white to violet, and appear at the onset of succulent non-carnivorous winter rosette in November.

== Distribution and habitat ==
Pinguicula conzattii is known only from its type location near Santiago Nuyoo in the district of Tlaxiaco in the Mexican state of Oaxaca. Here it grows on well-shaded vertical rock walls at around 2700 m. in altitude. Although it appears to have an extremely restricted distribution, little is yet known about this species.
