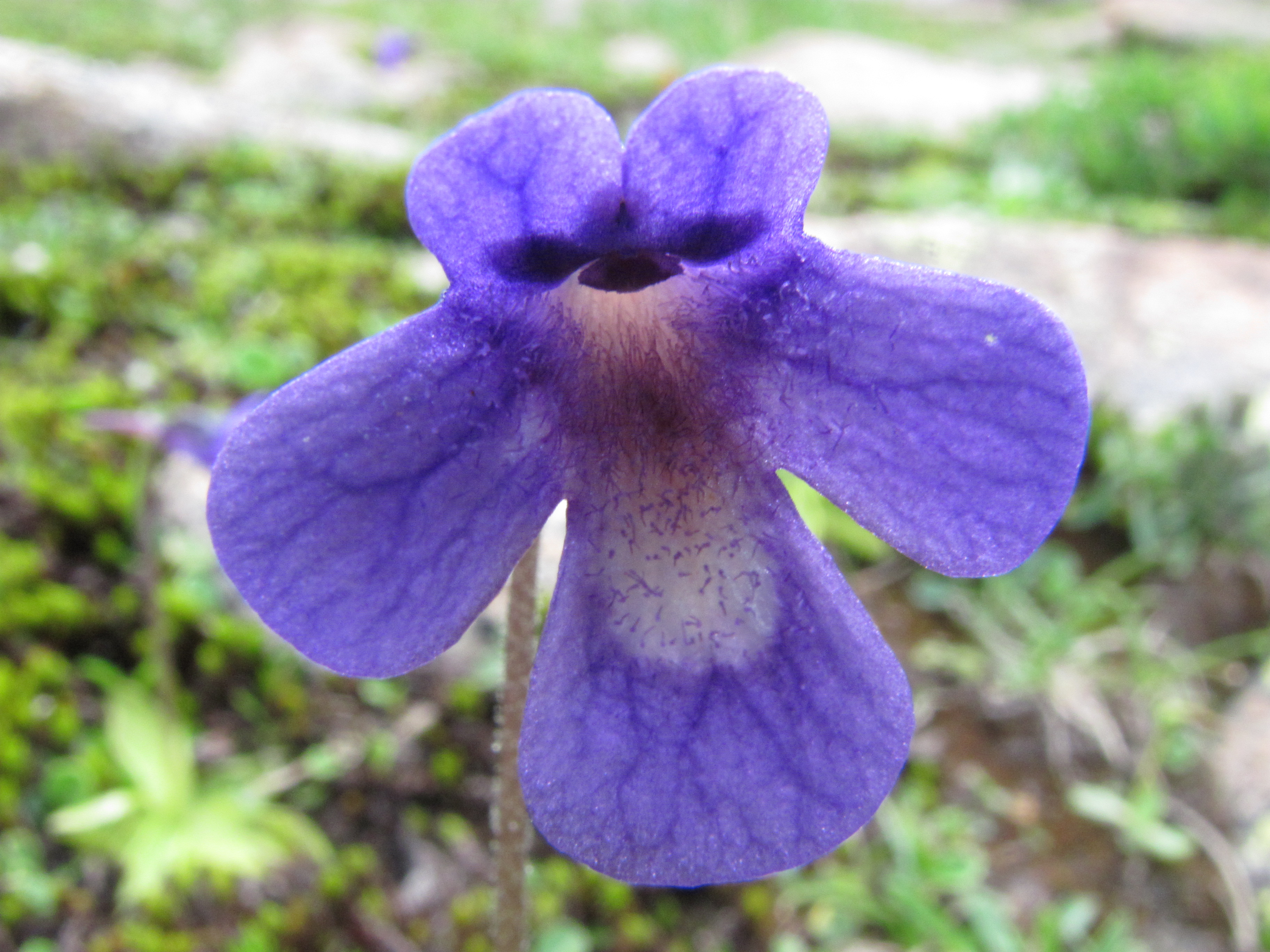

Scientific classification
- Kingdom: Plantae
- Clade: Tracheophytes
- Clade: Angiosperms
- Clade: Eudicots
- Clade: Asterids
- Order: Lamiales
- Family: Lentibulariaceae
- Genus: Pinguicula
- Species: P. balcanica

Binomial name
- Pinguicula balcanica Casper

= Pinguicula balcanica =

Species of plant

Pinguicula balcanica, also known as the Balkanian butterwort, is a perennial carnivorous plant in the family Lentibulariaceae. It is endemic to the Balkans, where it grows in wet, nutrient-poor environments like bogs and marshes.

== Description ==
Pinguicula balcanica is characterised by a temperate growth pattern, producing hibernacula (winter resting buds) for survival during cold periods. The plant typically develops 4–9 leaves in a basal rosette, with individual leaves measuring 20–50 mm long by 10–20 mm wide.

The flowers are distinctive, with blue petals featuring white marking(s) on the lower lip, particularly on the median lobe. A characteristic of the flowers is the partial or complete overlap of the two upper corolla lip lobes, while the three lobes of the lower lip are positioned close together but do not overlap. The corolla has a relatively narrow opening angle of 45–90°, giving the flower a less opened appearance compared to some other Pinguicula species.

Field specimens collected in Bulgaria's Vitosha and Pirin mountains showed flowers measuring 16–27 mm in length (including the spur), with spurs 5–7 mm long. The calyx structure and dimensions of the corolla lobes vary slightly between populations.

A distinctive feature observed in Bulgarian populations is the production of gemmae-like structures that likely serve in vegetative propagation. This characteristic had not been previously documented in P. balcanica or closely related species.

=== Reproduction ===
Pinguicula balcanica produces 1–5 flower stalks (peduncles) per plant, each measuring between 35–130 mm in length. It flowers in spring and early summer, with seeds developing later in the growing season. In addition to sexual reproduction through seeds, the species can propagate vegetatively through gemmae-like structures observed at the base of the plant.

== Distribution ==
The plant is endemic to the Balkans. It is found in Albania, Bulgaria, Greece, North Macedonia, Serbia and the North of Montenegro (Sandžak region). In Bulgaria, populations have been documented at elevations of approximately 1,700–2,000 m (5,600–6,600 ft) above sea level on Vitosha Mountain (near Sofia) and Pirin Mountain. Like most carnivorous plants, it grows in wet, nutrient-poor environments, specifically in marshes, bogs, and along streams on siliceous substrate.

== Taxonomy ==
Pinguicula balcanica was formally described as a new species in 1962 by the German biologist Siegfried Jost Casper. It replaced earlier misidentifications by Balkan botanists who had classified these plants as either P. vulgaris or P. leptoceras.
