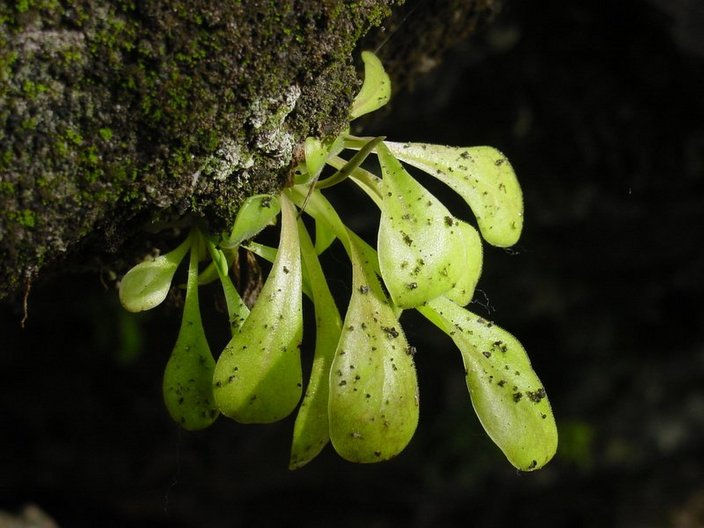
- In situ

Scientific classification
- Kingdom: Plantae
- Clade: Embryophytes
- Clade: Tracheophytes
- Clade: Spermatophytes
- Clade: Angiosperms
- Clade: Eudicots
- Clade: Asterids
- Order: Lamiales
- Family: Lentibulariaceae
- Genus: Pinguicula
- Species: P. laxifolia

Binomial name
- Pinguicula laxifolia Luhrs, 1995
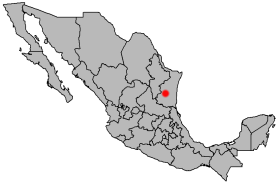
- Species distribution

= Pinguicula laxifolia =

Species of carnivorous plant

Pinguicula laxifolia is an insectivorous plant of the genus Pinguicula native to the Mexican state of Tamaulipas, the only member of the section Orchidioides. Its pendulous leaves are unusual in the genus, which features mostly species with stiff or succulent leaves.

== Morphology ==
Pinguicula laxifolia is a perennial rosetted herb bearing pendulous to semi-erect elliptic or oblanceolate 40–68 mm (1.6–2.7 in) long leaves. These are densely covered with stalked mucilaginous and sessile digestive glands, which serve to trap and digest insect prey and absorb the resulting nutrient mixture to supplement their nitrate-low environment. P. laxifolia forms Winter rosettes of succulent, non-carnivorous leaves to conserve energy through the cool, dry seasons, and as a means of self-propagation.

The flowers are pink to pale violet, with a white throat and darker violet markings. They are thought to appear from February through March.

== Distribution and habitat ==
Pinguicula laxifolia is known only from its remote type location in the "El Cielo" cloudforest bioreserve in Tamaulipas, Mexico, where it grows on well-shaded vertical rock walls from 6300 to 6800 ft. in altitude. It appears to have an extremely restricted distribution, and little is known about it.
