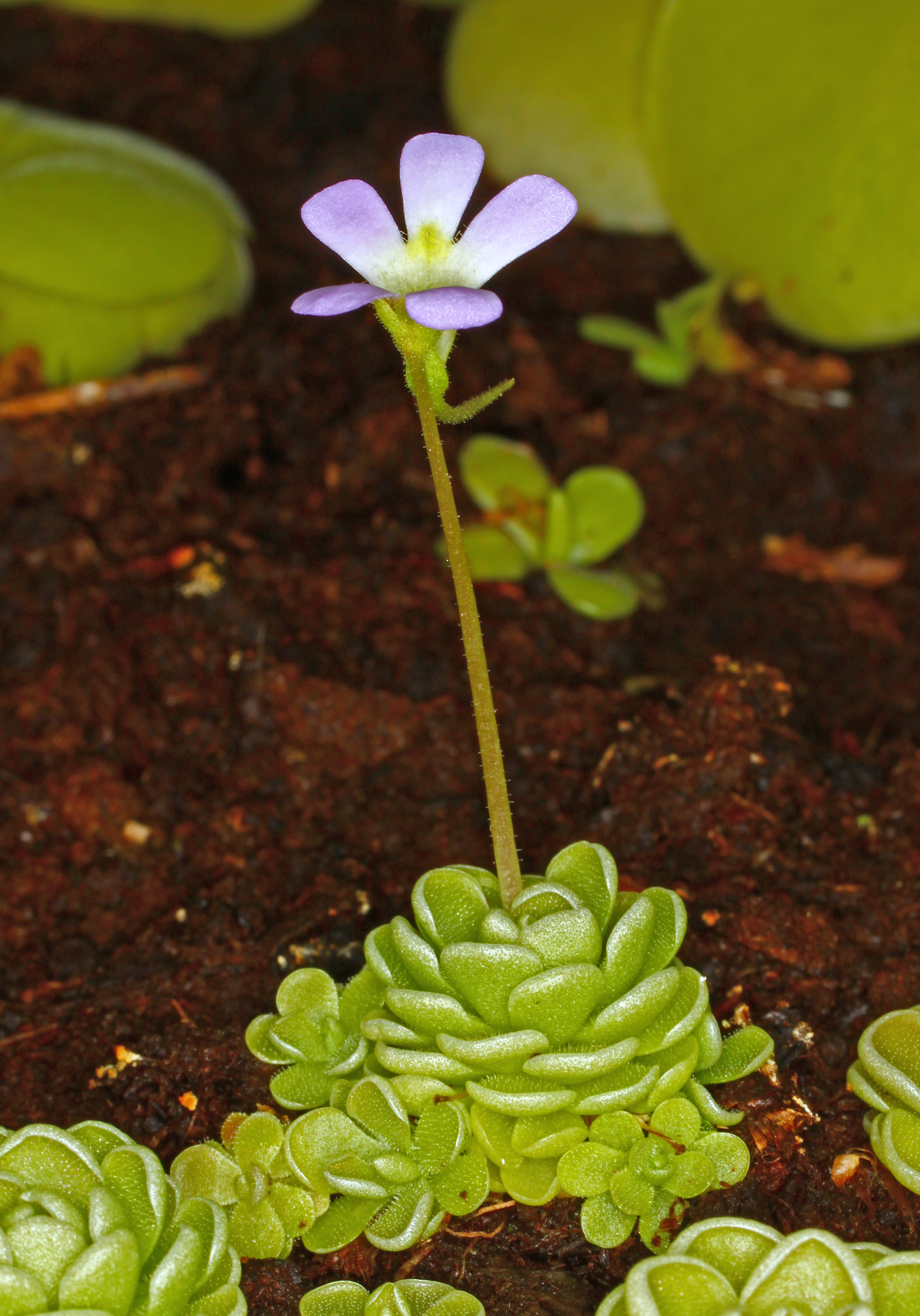
- Pinguicula esseriana in bloom

Scientific classification
- Kingdom: Plantae
- Clade: Tracheophytes
- Clade: Angiosperms
- Clade: Eudicots
- Clade: Asterids
- Order: Lamiales
- Family: Lentibulariaceae
- Genus: Pinguicula
- Species: P. esseriana

Binomial name
- Pinguicula esseriana B.Kirchn.

= Pinguicula esseriana =

Species of plant

Pinguicula esseriana is a small carnivorous plant in the genus Pinguicula, the butterworts. It is native to Mexico but is frost-tolerant despite its tropical habitat.
