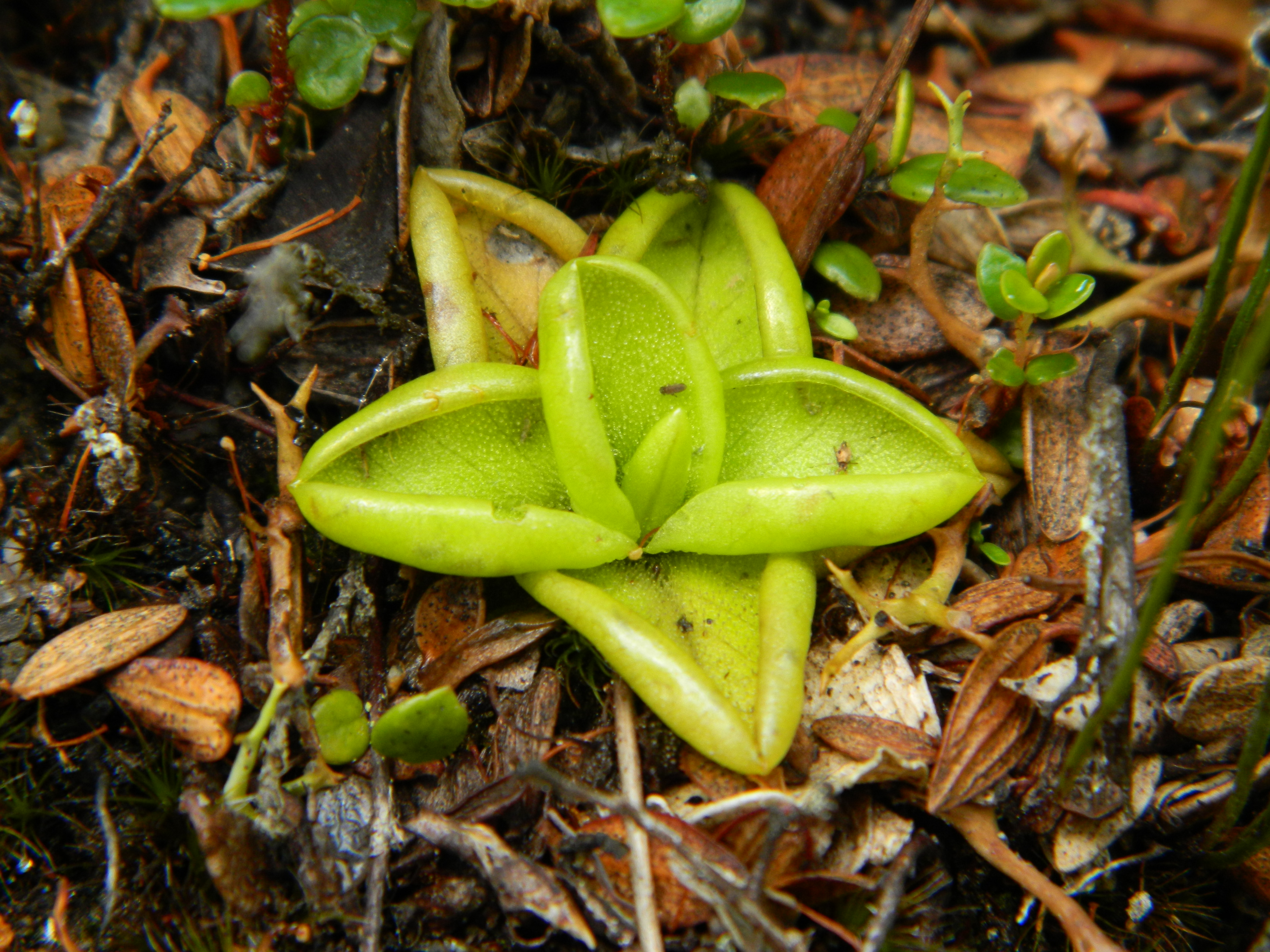

Scientific classification
- Kingdom: Plantae
- Clade: Embryophytes
- Clade: Tracheophytes
- Clade: Spermatophytes
- Clade: Angiosperms
- Clade: Eudicots
- Clade: Asterids
- Order: Lamiales
- Family: Lentibulariaceae
- Genus: Pinguicula
- Species: P. antarctica

Binomial name
- Pinguicula antarctica Vahl

Synonyms
- Pinguicula obtusa Herb. Banks ex Benj. Pinguicula magellanica Commers. ex Franch.

= Pinguicula antarctica =

Species of carnivorous plant

Pinguicula antarctica is a species of carnivorous plant from the genus Pinguicula, family Lentibulariaceae, described by Vahl. It is a perennial homophyllous butterwort found in temperate rainforests or peat bogs of southern Chile and Argentinian Patagonia.
