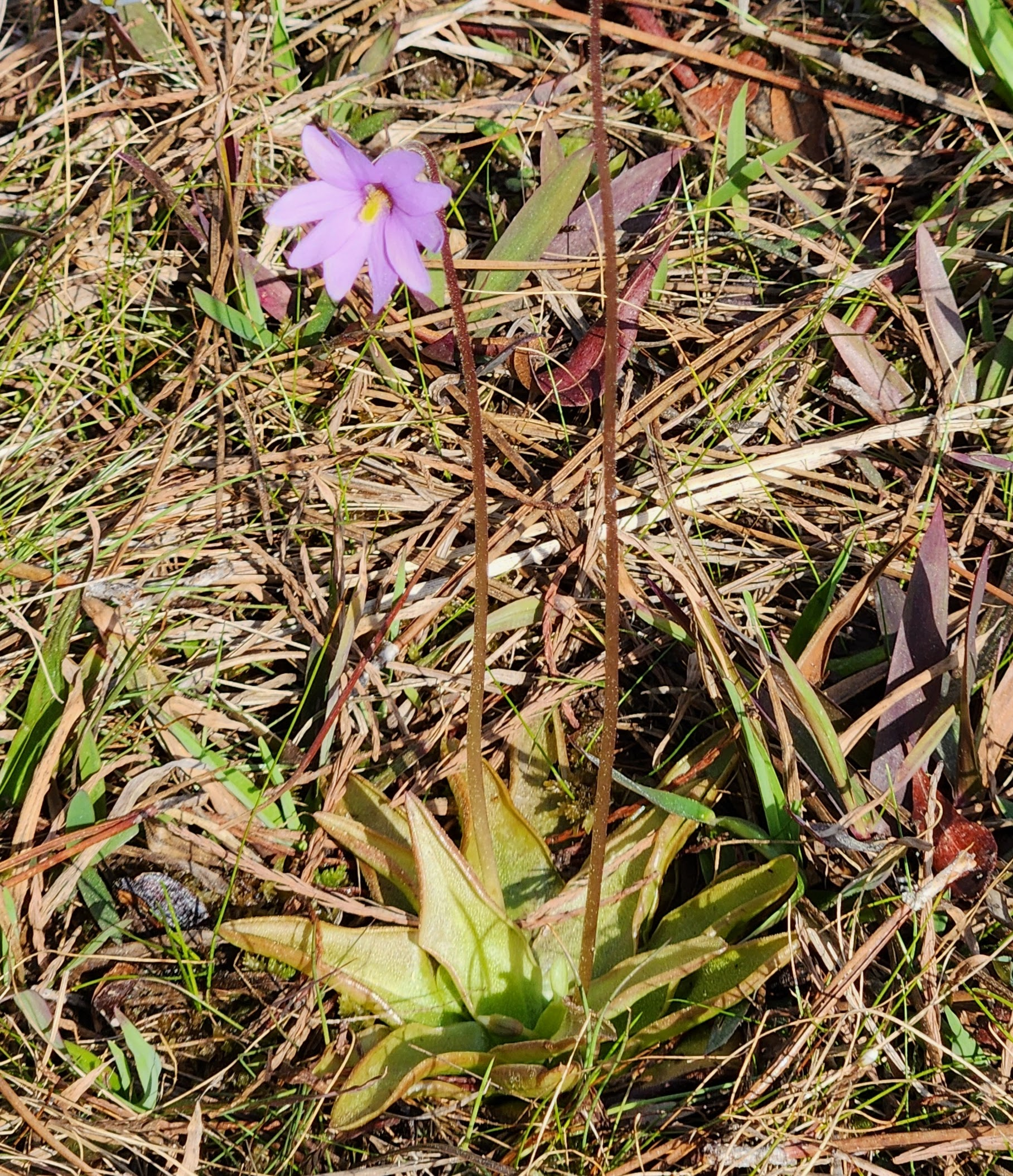

Conservation status
- Vulnerable (NatureServe)

Scientific classification
- Kingdom: Plantae
- Clade: Embryophytes
- Clade: Tracheophytes
- Clade: Angiosperms
- Clade: Eudicots
- Clade: Asterids
- Order: Lamiales
- Family: Lentibulariaceae
- Genus: Pinguicula
- Species: P. planifolia

Binomial name
- Pinguicula planifolia Chapm.

= Pinguicula planifolia =

Species of carnivorous plant

Pinguicula planifolia, commonly known as Chapman's butterwort, is a species of carnivorous plant belonging to the genus Pinguicula. The typical variety forms a purple (and sometimes pinkish or white) flower in blooming. Like other butterworts, it has sticky adhesive leaves that attract, capture and digest arthropod prey to supply the plant with nutrients. An identifying features of the Chapman's butterwort are the thin, flat leaves which often display a deep red to purple color when in full sun.

== Naming ==
The species name, planifolia, loosely translating to 'flat leaf,' comes from the Latin planus, meaning flat and folis, which means leaf.

== Flowers ==
Another identifying feature of Chapman's butterwort are the flowers which differ from most Pinguicula by the deep notches in the petals, with incisions close to half the petal length. Flowers are often purple, sometimes pinkish to white in color. The scape is often purple in color, covered in tiny hairs.

== Distribution ==
It is native to the southeastern United States, in southern Mississippi, Alabama, the panhandle region of Florida, and the extreme southeast extent of Louisiana.

== Habitat ==
Throughout their distribution, Chapman's butterwort can be found alongside many other carnivorous plants including Sarracenia and Drosera. Commonly found in depressions of pinelands, bogs, wet prairies, and swamps, as well as man-made drainage ditches, retention ponds, and edges of roadways. Due to the moisture requirements of the plant, it is common for the habitat to be partially submerged during wet seasons and due to weather phenomona. The Chapman's butterwort can thrive in a terrestrial, exposed environment, as well as fully submerged.

Chapman's butterwort is listed as threatened in the state of Florida due to habitat loss from drainage of wetlands, development, lack of prescribed burns, and illegal collection.
