= Cassiano Conzatti =

Mexican botanist (1862–1951)

Cassiano Conzatti (13 August 1862 Civezzano – 2 March 1951 Oaxaca), aka Cassiano Bartolameotti-Conzatti, was a botanist, botanical explorer and pteridologist, and director of the Oaxaca Botanical Garden in Mexico. Conzatti lived and worked in Mexico for the greater part of his life and was an early authority on the flora of Oaxaca.

Born in the Italian speaking part of Tyrol in the Austrian Empire he began his studies at the Gymnasium Roveretano. His father's death in 1877 obliged him to abandon his studies and support his family. Leaving Europe in the autumn of 1881 on the steamboat Atlantico, they became one of the first Italian speaking families to settle in Veracruz under the Mexican colonisation program sponsored by both governments.

His family having been settled in the colony 'Manuel González', Conzatti was not content to live an agrarian life and left for Jalapa, leaving his mother in the care of his two brothers. He became an assistant at the Ateneo Veracruzano College, receiving poor pay and working long hours, with the prospect of becoming a teacher. Conzatti had started a botanical collection while in Italy and continued with this in Jalapa, creating a key to the phanerogamic families of Mexico which was published in 1889.

In 1885 Conzatti took an appointment as teaching assistant at the school Cantonal de Coatepec, earning sufficient money to send to his family. He worked under Professor Rebsamen, taking care of the administration of the Practical School, an offshoot of the Cantonal de Coatepec, and in 1889 became director of the school Modelo de Orizaba. In 1891 he moved to Oaxaca where he would spend the rest of his life and began to direct the Escuela Normal de Profesores. He filled this position for 20 years, teaching education and anthropology, and remaining active in his botanical studies.

In 1909 he began to display symptoms of a neurological condition, resigning as director of the school, but soon after was appointed director of the Botanic Gardens of Oaxaca. The naturalist Alfonso L. Herrera founded the Administration of Biological Sciences; Conzatti worked in the organisation, making use of its large library and botanic garden to further his studies. In 1919 he collected throughout the state, publishing a work on Oaxaca and its natural resources in 1920. In 1922 he returned to education and became the Oaxaca delegate for the Public Education Secretariat, serving as a school inspector from 1924 up to his retirement in 1927.

While Conzatti never received a formal botanical training, his interest and dedication led to a thorough knowledge of Mexican plants and major contributions to botany.

He warned about the dangers of agro-pastoral fires in Mexico and foresaw droughts and underground water supplies being threatened by ill-considered burning:

"Soon I will complete 25 years living in Oaxaca, and not one time in this quarter century have I missed seeing ... fire on the hills which surround it. The summits ... are all that is left. The remaining forest cannot burn because it burnt in previous years."

— Conzatti (1914)

Conzatti published 32 works on the local Mexican flora, described 92 new plant species and gathered some 10 000 specimens. These included the type material for the Rutaceae species Amyris conzattii Standl. He is commemorated in the genus Conzattia, Pinguicula conzattii Zamudio & van Marm (Lentibulariaceae), Russelia conzattii Carlson, Saurauia conzattii Buscal., Sophora conzattii Standl., Waltheria conzattii Standl., Vallesia conzattii Standl., Tephrosia conzattii (Rydb.) Standl., Portulaca conzattii P. Wilson, Schoenocaulon conzattii Brinker, Drymaria conzattii Duke, Passiflora conzattiana Killip and numerous others.

== Bibliography ==
- Cassiano Conzatti - Il biologo e pedagogo trentino in Messico, Renzo Tommasi

== Publications ==
- Flora Sinoptica Mexicana, Cassiano Conzatti & Lucio C. Smith (1895-1981)
- Los géneros vegetales mexicanos, Cassiano Conzatti (1903)
- Plant genera of Mexico (1905)
- El estado de Oaxaca y sus recursos naturales, Cassiano Conzatti (1920)
- Monografia del arbol de Santa Maria del Tule, Casiano Conzatti (1921); see Árbol del Tule
- Una expedicion botanica a la costa oaxaqueña del Suroeste, Cassiano Conzatti (1922)
- Las regiones botánico-geográficas del estado de Oaxaca : con una carta anexa - Cassiano Conzatti (1926)
- Flora Taxonómica Mexicana: Recopilacion de Todos sus Representantes Vasculares, Herbaceos y Leñosos. Mexico, D.F. (1939–42)
- Flora taxonómica mexicana (plantas vasculares)(1946)
