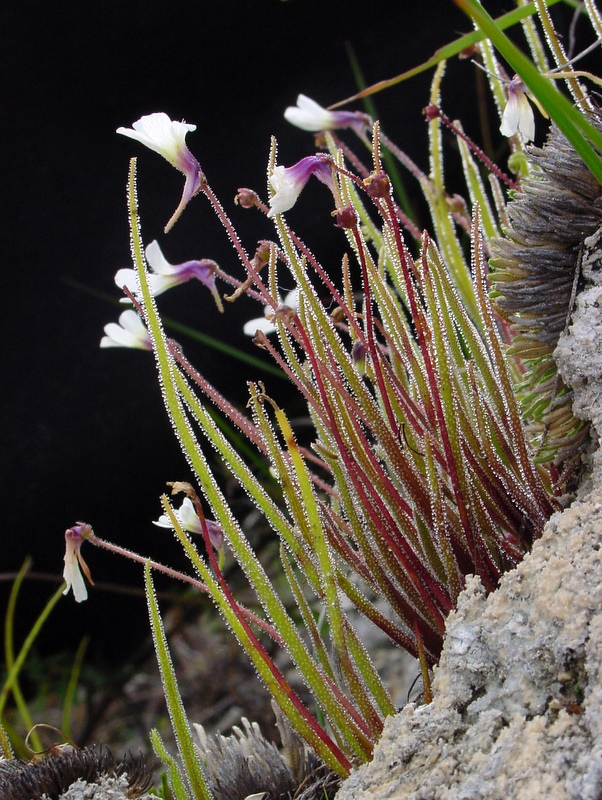
- In habitat in Oaxaca

Scientific classification
- Kingdom: Plantae
- Clade: Tracheophytes
- Clade: Angiosperms
- Clade: Eudicots
- Clade: Asterids
- Order: Lamiales
- Family: Lentibulariaceae
- Genus: Pinguicula
- Species: P. heterophylla

Binomial name
- Pinguicula heterophylla Benth.

= Pinguicula heterophylla =

Species of carnivorous plant

Pinguicula heterophylla /pɪŋˈɡwɪkjʊlə ˌhətərəˈfɪlə/ is a perennial rosette-forming carnivorous plant in the flowering plant family Lentibulariaceae. It is endemic to the Mexican states of Morelos, Guerrero and Oaxaca.

The species was first described by George Bentham in 1840, based on material collected by Karl Theodor Hartweg.
