= Pinguicula hemiepiphytica =

Scientific classification
- Kingdom: Plantae
- Clade: Tracheophytes
- Clade: Angiosperms
- Clade: Eudicots
- Clade: Asterids
- Order: Lamiales
- Family: Lentibulariaceae
- Genus: Pinguicula
- Species: P. hemiepiphytica

Binomial name
- Pinguicula hemiepiphytica Zamudio & Rzed.

Species of carnivorous plant

Pinguicula hemiepiphytica is a tropical carnivorous plant species native to the cloud forests of Oaxaca, Mexico. It was first identified in 1991 and is one of the few epiphytic species in the genus.

== Description ==
Pinguicula hemiepiphytica is an 8–20 cm tall, carnivorous plant that grows on rocks or trees.

There are two forms, distinguished by leaf type. In both forms, the leaves are arranged in dense whorls around the base of the stem. The summer form of the plant has 4 to 12 nearly circular leaves that serve to catch small insects. The leaves are covered in mucus, making the leaf surface sticky. When an insect is caught, it triggers the secretion of digestive enzymes. Leaf color is light green to purplish-pink. The winter form of the plant has far more leaves than the summer form, but the leaves are shorter and narrower. All glands are absent, so this form is not able to trap or digest insects. The leaves are light green.

During the summer months, individuals bear up to three solitary flowers. Flowers are perfect, bilaterally symmetrical, have a five lobed corolla, and are purple to pink in color. The corolla tube extends beyond the flower's point of attachment to the stem, forming a spur.

== Ecology ==
Pinguicula hemiepiphytica has only been documented in the cloud forests of Sierra de Juarez, Mexico, although it is suspected to exist in neighboring areas with a similar environment. Its habitat is very wet, and they typically grow with colonies of mosses. The long spur of the flower is a trait that Pinguicula species pollinated by butterflies, moths, and birds have in common. The species is believed to be hummingbird pollinated, given the length of the floral spur. It has been found that species in this group do not offer food rewards in their floral trichomes to pollinators. Like most Pinguicula, they can also self-pollinate and reproduce vegetatively.

Carnivory in plants is an adaptation for nutrient acquisition in nutrient poor soils. The roots mainly serve to adhere the plant to its substrate and absorb water. Growing on a vertical surface exposes the plant to more sunlight, and water that runs down the sides of the trees and rocks they are growing on.

== Uses ==
The term “pinguis” is Latin for “grease”, which suits this genus that uses its sticky and greasy leaves to trap prey. This adaptation can be employed by plant collectors to control fungus gnat populations

Pinguicula hemiepiphytica is most commonly cultivated for use in the nursery trade. Mexican Pinguicula are popular for being relatively easy to grow; P. hemiepiphytica is cultivated and sometimes hybridized with other species for sale to hobbyists. Biological resource use is also associated with this species; 22% of Pinguicula species are illegally poached and traded for biological uses that are rarely medicinal or pharmaceutical

In Oaxaca, Mexico where these species are native, the Zapotec use P. moranensis to treat “culture-bound syndromes'', including “mal de ojo” and “susto”. Until 1991, P. hemiepiphytica was considered to be a variety of P. moranensis because of their similar morphologies and range; it's possible that both species are used by the Zapotec
