= Pinguicula lithophytica =

Scientific classification
- Kingdom: Plantae
- Clade: Tracheophytes
- Clade: Angiosperms
- Clade: Eudicots
- Clade: Asterids
- Order: Lamiales
- Family: Lentibulariaceae
- Genus: Pinguicula
- Species: P. lithophytica

Binomial name
- Pinguicula lithophytica Panfet & P.Temple

Species of carnivorous plant

Pinguicula lithophytica is a species of butterwort that is endemic to the central region of Cuba. It was described by Cristina M. Panfet-Valdés and Paul Temple in 2008. They placed it in subgenus Isoloba, section Agnata, noting that there were morphological similarities between P. lithophytica and P. jackii.
