= Pinguicula poldinii =

Scientific classification
- Kingdom: Plantae
- Clade: Tracheophytes
- Clade: Angiosperms
- Clade: Eudicots
- Clade: Asterids
- Order: Lamiales
- Family: Lentibulariaceae
- Genus: Pinguicula
- Species: P. poldinii

Binomial name
- Pinguicula poldinii S. J. Casper & J. Steiger, 2001

Species of carnivorous plant

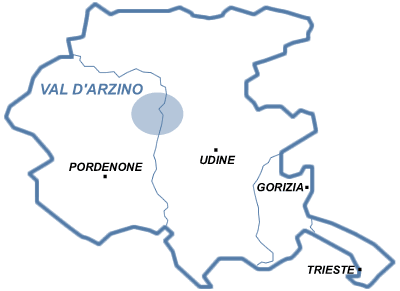
Val d'Arzino map. Udine is the location of several populations.

Pinguicula poldinii is a species of insectivorous plant endemic to Val d'Arzino, Italy, where it grows at elevations of 450–550 meters. It is restricted to steep rocks (in a habitat created mainly as a result of disturbance in a construction site) throughout a very small area in which it is threatened by over-collection. It was described in 2001.
