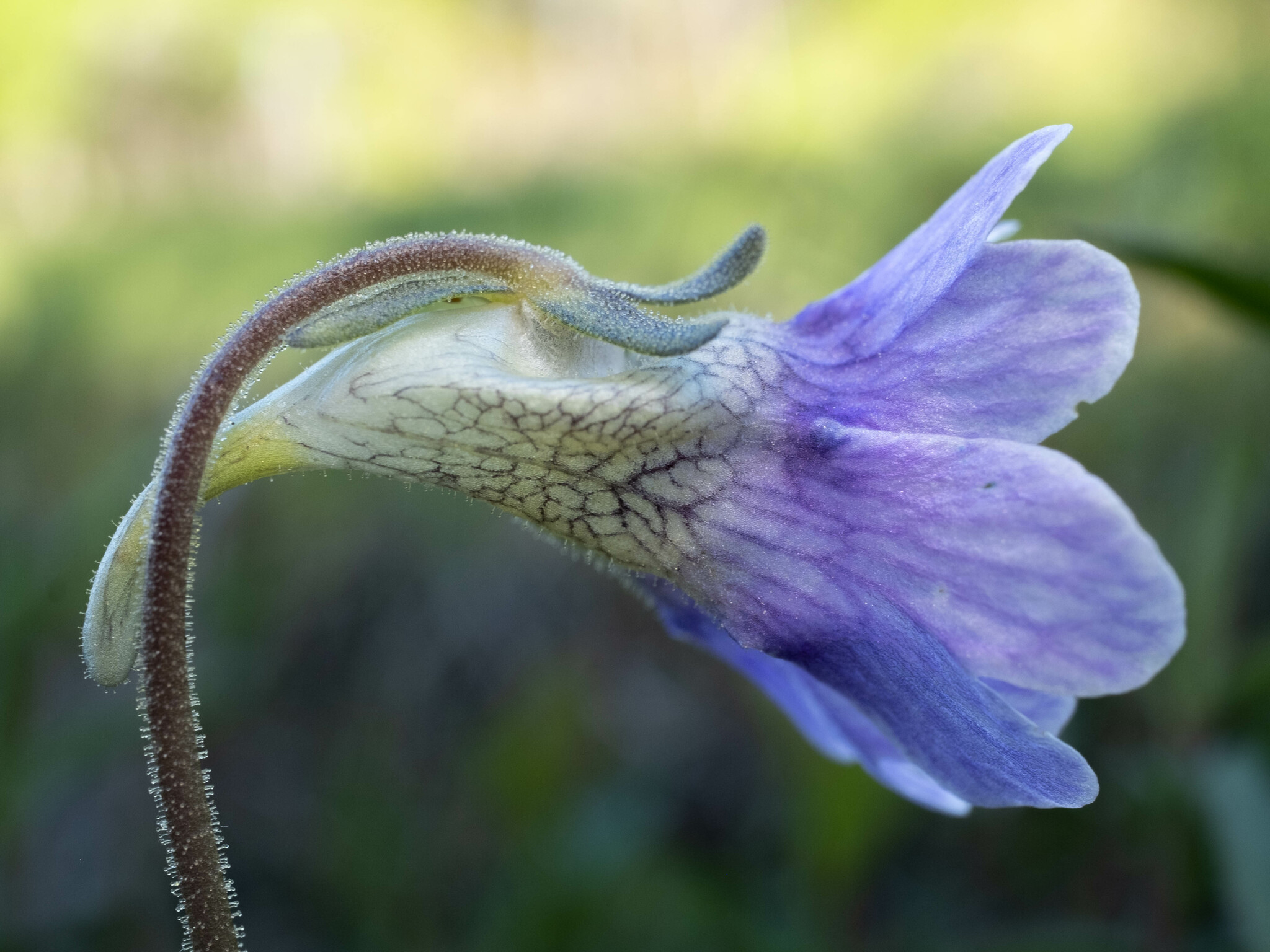

Scientific classification
- Kingdom: Plantae
- Clade: Tracheophytes
- Clade: Angiosperms
- Clade: Eudicots
- Clade: Asterids
- Order: Lamiales
- Family: Lentibulariaceae
- Genus: Pinguicula
- Species: P. caerulea

Binomial name
- Pinguicula caerulea Walter

= Pinguicula caerulea =

Species of carnivorous plant

Pinguicula caerulea, commonly referred to as blue butterwort, blueflower butterwort, or violet butterwort, is a flowering plant species in the carnivorous butterwort (Pinguicula) genus and bladderwort family (Lentibulariaceae). It is a perennial dicot. It grows in moist sandy pineland habitat in the south-east USA. Caerulus is Latin for from the sky or sea and refers to the color of the flowers.

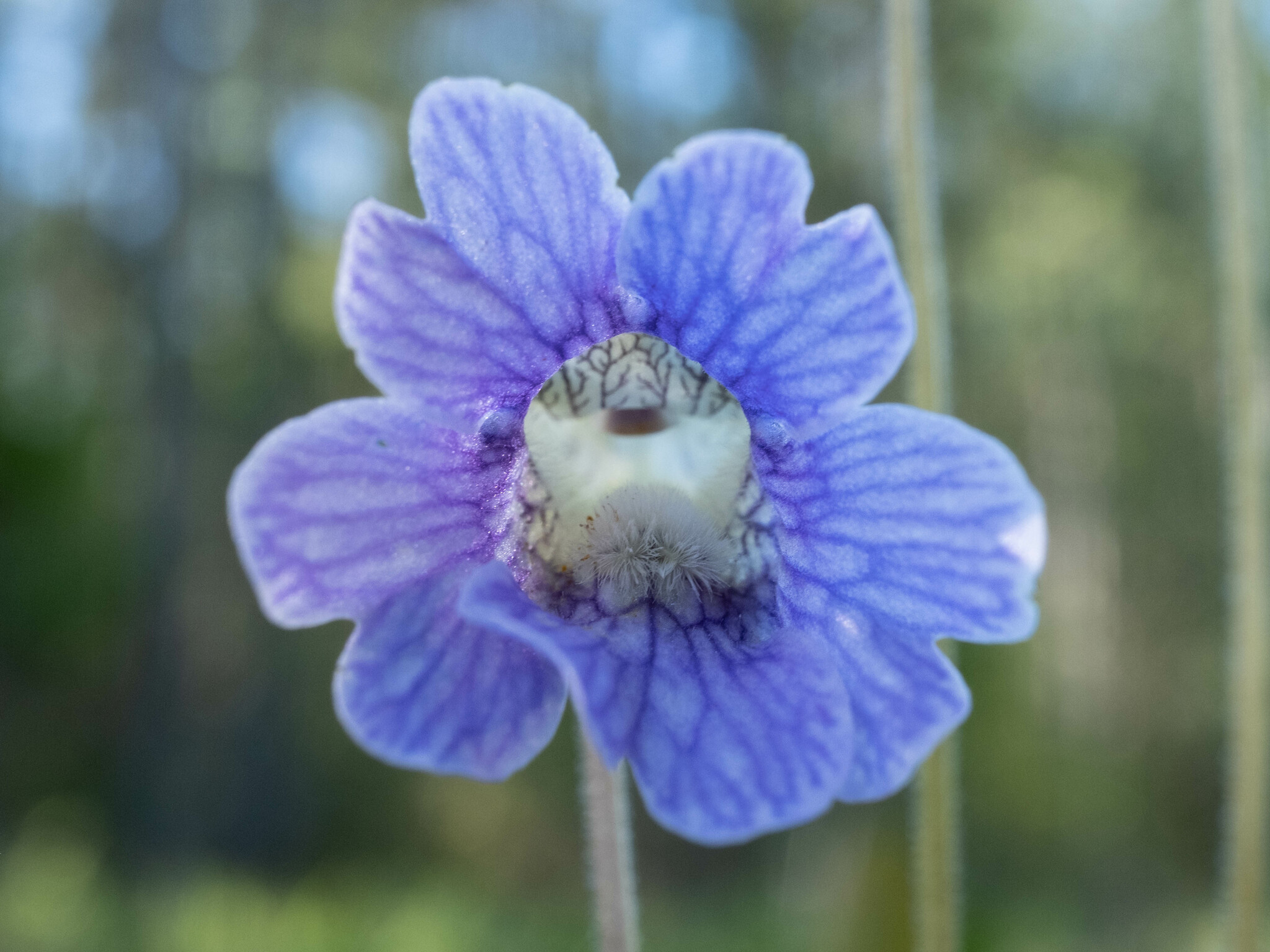

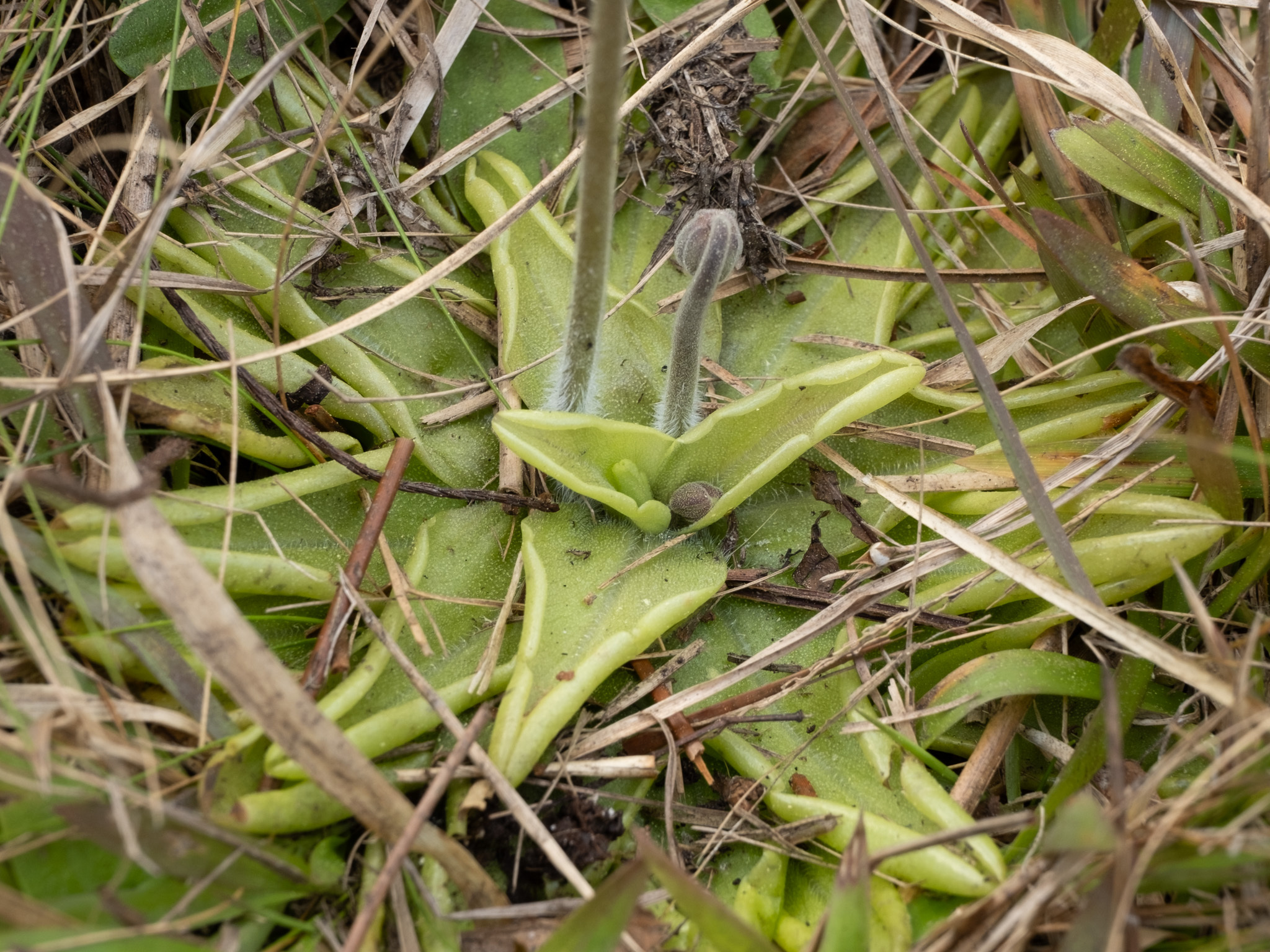
