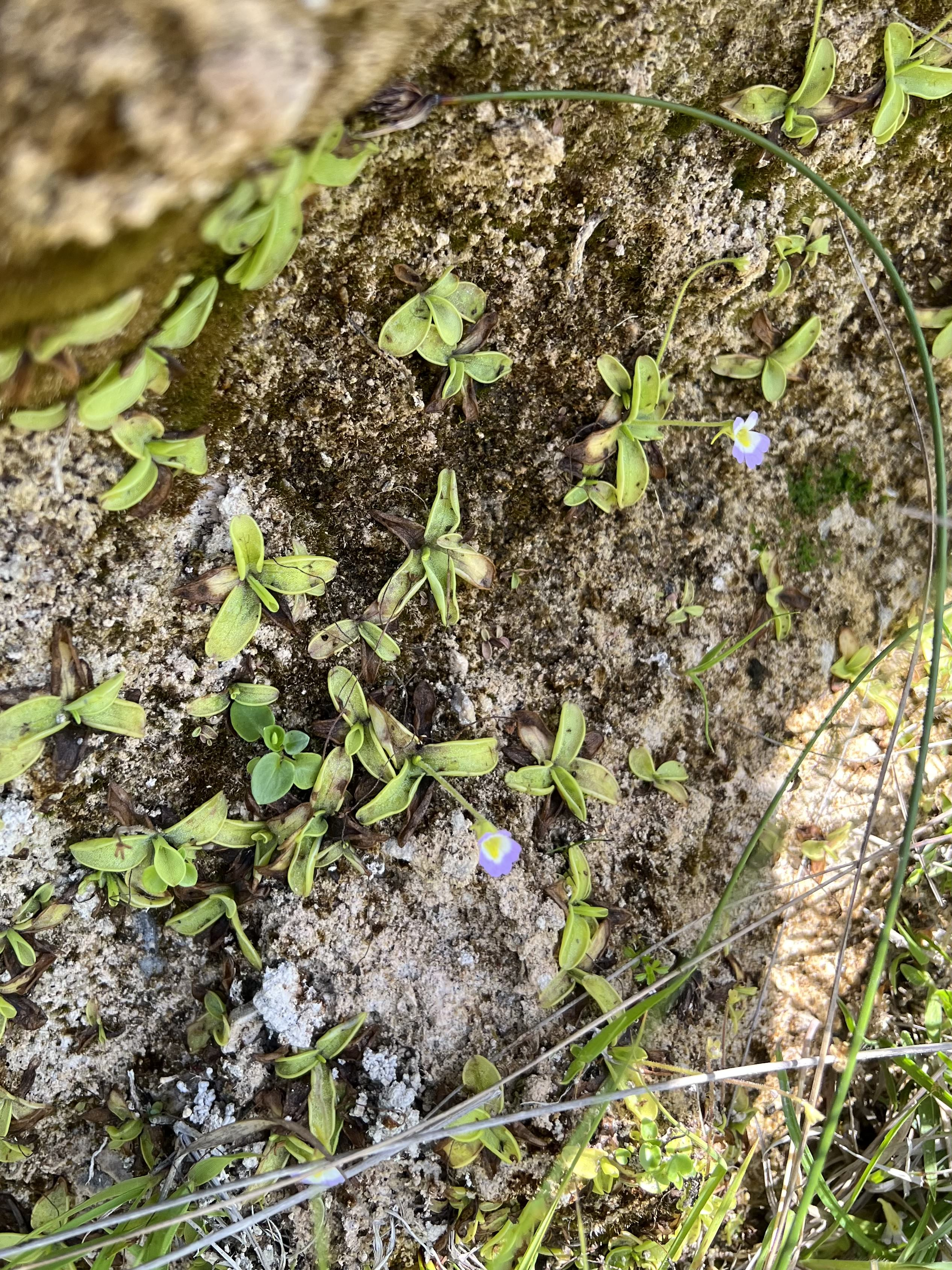
- Pinguicula hirtiflora in Montenegro.

Scientific classification
- Kingdom: Plantae
- Clade: Tracheophytes
- Clade: Angiosperms
- Clade: Eudicots
- Clade: Asterids
- Order: Lamiales
- Family: Lentibulariaceae
- Genus: Pinguicula
- Species: P. hirtiflora

Binomial name
- Pinguicula hirtiflora Ten.

= Pinguicula hirtiflora =

Species of carnivorous plant

Pinguicula hirtiflora, also known as the hairy-flowered butterwort, is a perennial carnivorous plant in the family Lentibulariaceae.

== Description ==
Pinguicula hirtiflora is a perennial plant with six leaves in an overwintering rosette. The leaves are oblong-ovate to elliptical, obtuse or emarginate at the apex, with margins slightly rolled inwards. There are one to three flowers on delicate long stems up to 15 cm (5.9 in) long. The upper lip of the calyx is spatulate, and the lower one has very short, ovoid lobes. The corolla is 16 to 25 mm (0.63 to 0.98 in) long, pale pink to pale blue with a yellow throat and a funnel-shaped spur. The corolla lips are uneven. Upper lip is 2-lobed, with entirely, rarely slightly, emarginate lobes. Lower lip is longer, deeply 3-lobed, with obovate lobes two times longer than wide, emarginate at apex, rarely rounded. Spur is up to 13 mm (0.51 in) long, straight or slightly deflected. Capsule is globose. Pinguicula hirtiflora flowers from April to October, bearing fruit from June to December.

== Habitat ==
Gregarious populations are found on shady steep rocks with seeping water, around springs, along streams and brooks running through wet meadows or peat bogs, on serpentine, limestone, dolomite, tufa or flysch. Plants can be found growing from 0 to 1,900 m (0 to 6,234 ft) ASL.

== Distribution ==
Populations are scattered through Italy, Balkan Peninsula, and southeastern parts of Turkey. There are four introduced populations, two near Bern and Interlaken in Switzerland, one near Tichá in Czech Republic and one in Roya Valley in France. In Italy it is restricted to Campania. In Serbia, it is known from two sites – one in Morina Pass and one on Mt. Koznik. In Montenegro, there are two small sites – one on Mt. Bijela gora, and another one on a small tufa rock in a forest near Ostrog Monastery. In Albania, it is widely distributed from Lake Skadar and Qafa e Markofçës to Gërmenj-Shelegur in the southeast. In Greece, it is known from Vardousia, Gramos, Olympus and Aroania.

Pinguicula hirtiflora is endangered due to drying of seepages, rock degradation and roadworks.
