= Pinguicula chuquisacensis =

Scientific classification
- Kingdom: Plantae
- Clade: Tracheophytes
- Clade: Angiosperms
- Clade: Eudicots
- Clade: Asterids
- Order: Lamiales
- Family: Lentibulariaceae
- Genus: Pinguicula
- Species: P. chuquisacensis

Binomial name
- Pinguicula chuquisacensis S.Beck, A.Fleischm. & Borsch (2008)

Species of carnivorous plant

Pinguicula chuquisacensis is an insectivorous plant of the genus Pinguicula

== Description ==
Plant is somewhat erect, with leaves flat upon the growing surface. Hibernacula are absent. The plant possesses 4–6 loblong to ovate-oblong leave, forming a rosette. Flowers small, at 13–15 mm long, including the spur (which is 2–3 mm in length). Plants flower in July, and fruit in November among remaining flowers. The authors have recommended that the species be classified as CR (Critically Endangered) according to criteria B2a+b due to a small area of occupancy and potential and ongoing threats to areas near to and in the immediate area of the cliff side. Genetically, P. chuquisacensis is closest to P. involuta and P. calyptrata (respectively).

== Distribution and habitat ==
P. chuquisacensis is endemic to Bolivia, where it grows at an elevation of 2,400 m (7,900 ft) above sea level. P. chuquisacensis is restricted to the valley of Nuevo Mundo, on one cliff face northeast of Villa Serrano. The species only exists on acidic sandstone formations frequently veiled in fog, growing perennially in open areas.
