= Pinguicula rotundiflora =

Scientific classification
- Kingdom: Plantae
- Clade: Embryophytes
- Clade: Tracheophytes
- Clade: Angiosperms
- Clade: Eudicots
- Clade: Asterids
- Order: Lamiales
- Family: Lentibulariaceae
- Genus: Pinguicula
- Species: P. rotundiflora

Binomial name
- Pinguicula rotundiflora Studnicka

Synonyms
- Pinguicula jorgehintonii B.L.Turner

Species of flowering plant

Pinguicula rotundiflora is a species of carnivorous plant in the butterwort genus Pinguicula, family Lentibulariaceae, native to northeastern Mexico. It has gained the Royal Horticultural Society's Award of Garden Merit.
