= Pinguicula caryophyllacea =

Scientific classification
- Kingdom: Plantae
- Clade: Tracheophytes
- Clade: Angiosperms
- Clade: Eudicots
- Clade: Asterids
- Order: Lamiales
- Family: Lentibulariaceae
- Genus: Pinguicula
- Species: P. caryophyllacea

Binomial name
- Pinguicula caryophyllacea Casper

Synonyms
- Pinguicula toldensis Casper

Species of carnivorous plant

Pinguicula caryophyllacea is an insectivorous plant of the genus Pinguicula. it is a perennial or lithophyte endemic to the Nipe-Sagua-Baracoa mountain region of eastern Cuba.
