= Siegfried Jost Casper =

German biologist (1929–2021)

Siegfried Jost Casper (12 January 1929 – 13 June 2021) was a German biologist whose primary research was in limnology and the plant genus Pinguicula (the butterworts). Together with Heinz-Dieter Krausch he published a basic reference work on the freshwater flora of central Europe. For many years he studied the East German lake Stechlinsee as well as the river Saale. In 1966 he published a monograph of the genus Pinguicula, a work that is still in use today. He described at least 14 new species, most recently Pinguicula lippoldii and Pinguicula toldensis in 2007. He served as head of the Botanical Garden of the Friedrich Schiller University of Jena and from 1990 until his death was a member of the "Akademie Gemeinnütziger Wissenschaften" in Erfurt.

== Publications ==
- Monographie der Gattung Pinguicula L., (Bibliotheca Botanica, Heft 127/128), 1966, Stuttgart
