= List of Venus flytrap cultivars =

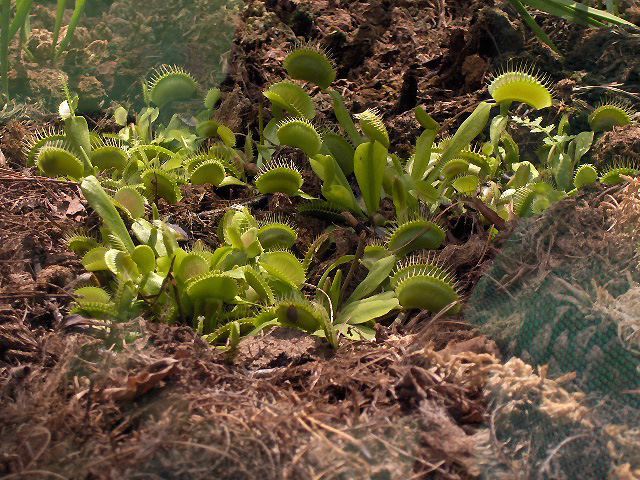
Typical variety of the Venus flytrap

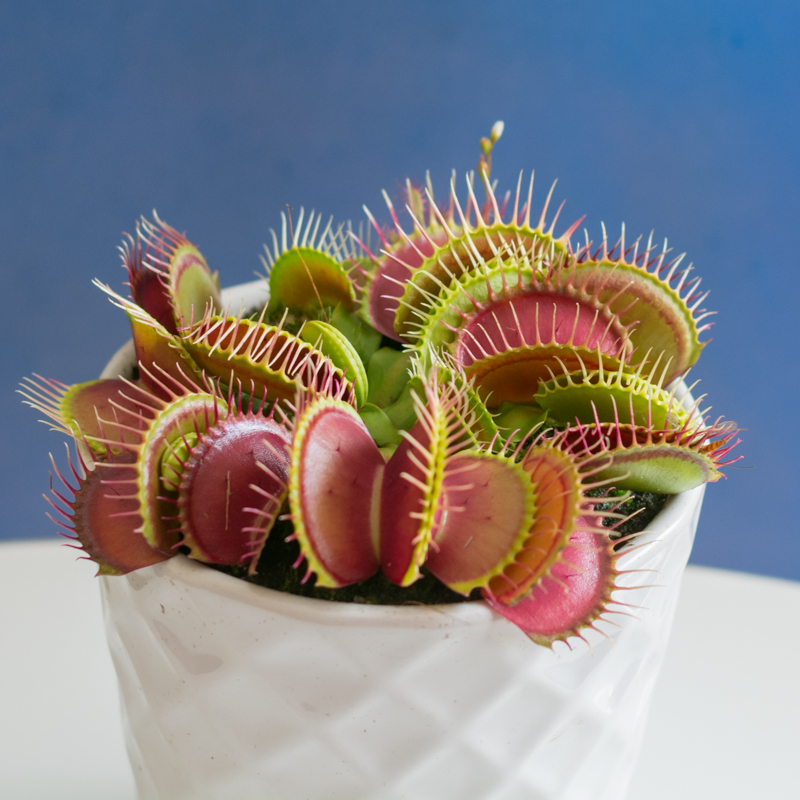
'B52' produces some of the largest traps of any cultivar

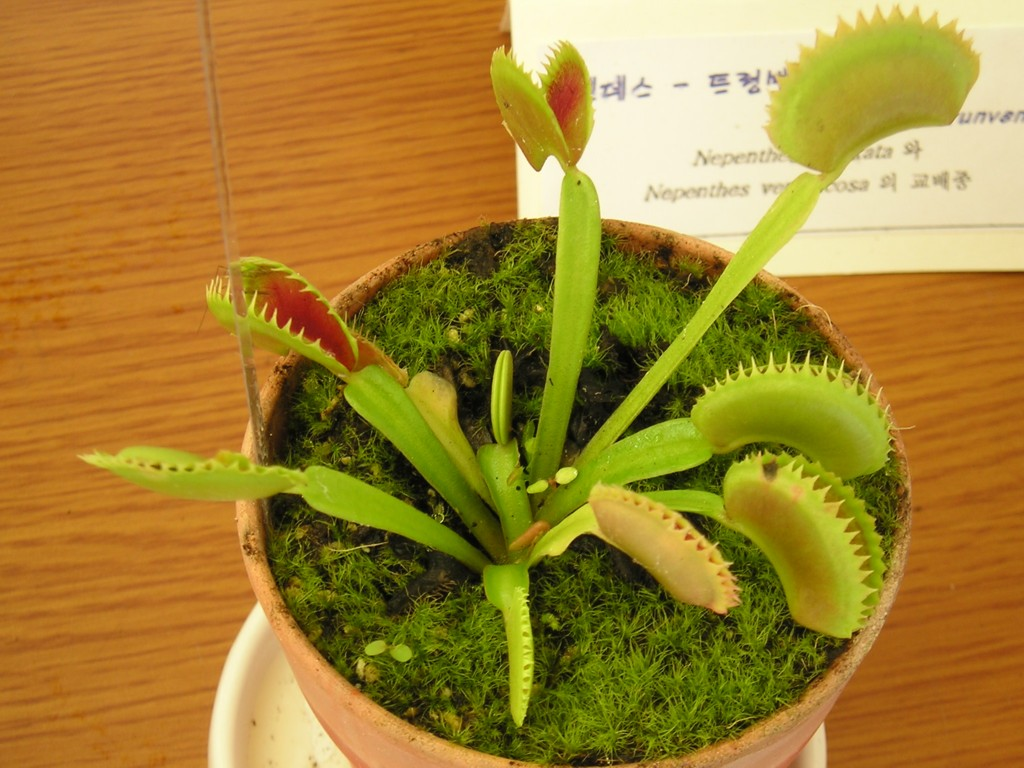
The 'Dentate' cultivar

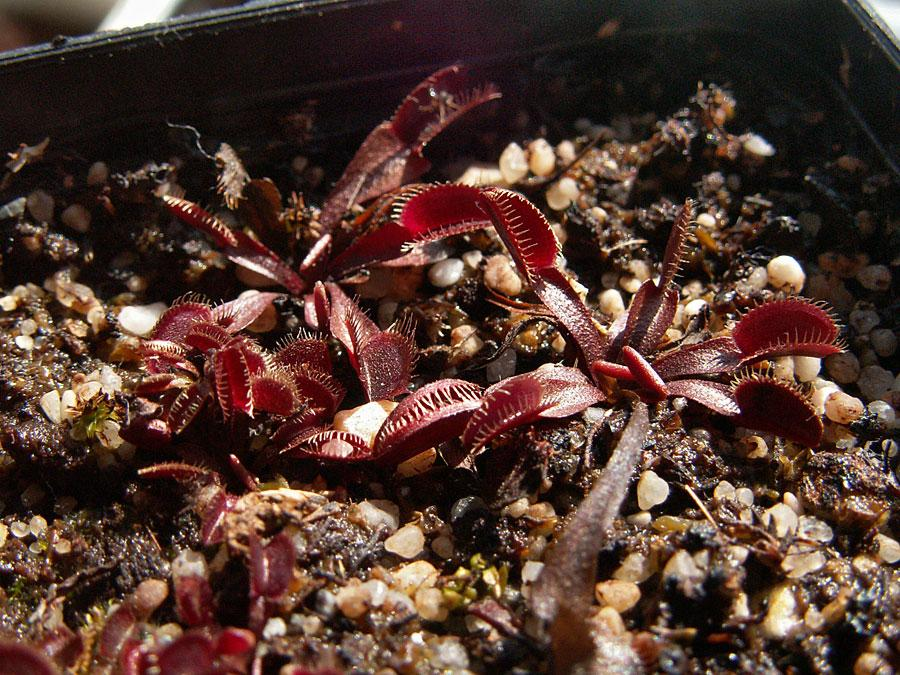
Dionaea muscipula 'Akai Ryu', Japanese for 'Red Dragon'

Venus flytraps are by far the most commonly recognized and cultivated carnivorous plant. They are sold as houseplants and are often found at florists, hardware stores and supermarkets. Since around 2012, large numbers of cultivars (cultivated varieties) have come into the market through tissue culture of selected genetic mutations. It is through tissue culture that great quantities of plants are raised for commercial markets.

The registered cultivars include (name of registrant in braces):

- Dionaea muscipula 'Akai Ryu' {Ron Gagliardo}
- Dionaea muscipula 'Alien' {Guillaume Bily}
- Dionaea muscipula 'B52' {Barry Meyers-Rice}
- Dionaea muscipula 'Blanche Hermine' {Guillaume Bily}
- Dionaea muscipula 'Bohemian Garnet' {Miroslav Srba}
- Dionaea muscipula 'Clayton's Red Sunset' {Colin Clayton}
- Dionaea muscipula 'Coquillage' {Guillaume Bily}
- Dionaea muscipula 'Cupped Trap' {Steven Stewart}
- Dionaea muscipula 'Dentate Traps' {Barry Meyers-Rice}
- Dionaea muscipula 'Fondue' {Guillaume Bily}
- Dionaea muscipula 'Fused Tooth' {Peter D'Amato & Thomas Carow}
- Dionaea muscipula 'Green Dragon' {Marcus Erbacher & M. Stoeckl}
- Dionaea muscipula 'Holland Red' {Marcus Erbacher & M. Stoeckl}
- Dionaea muscipula 'JA1' {Julio Alberto González Domínguez}
- Dionaea muscipula 'Jaws' {Leo Song Jr.}
- Dionaea muscipula 'Justina Davis' {Barry Meyers-Rice}
- Dionaea muscipula 'Korean Melody Shark' {Jang Gi-Won & Wook Hyon (Max) Yoon}
- Dionaea muscipula 'Korrigans' {Guillaume Bily}
- Dionaea muscipula 'Louchapates' {Romuald Anfraix}
- Dionaea muscipula 'Microdent' {Gayl Quenon} [originally published as Dionaea muscipula 'Microdents']
- Dionaea muscipula 'Mirror' {Dieter Blancquaert}
- Dionaea muscipula 'Orange Neat Trap' {Jae-Hwan Lee}
- Dionaea muscipula 'Petite Dragon' {Robert Ziemer}
- Dionaea muscipula 'Red Burgundy' {Marcus Erbacher & M. Stoeckl}
- Dionaea muscipula 'Red Neat Trap' {Jae-Hwan Lee}
- Dionaea muscipula 'Red Piranha' {Edward Read}
- Dionaea muscipula 'Royal Red' {Geoffrey Mansell}
- Dionaea muscipula 'Sawtooth' {Barry Meyers-Rice}
- Dionaea muscipula 'Scarlatine' {Lucien Blacher}
- Dionaea muscipula 'Scarlet Bristle' {Real Keehn Concepts}
- Dionaea muscipula 'Small Fast' {Jae-Hwan Lee}
- Dionaea muscipula 'Viper Trap' {Jae-Hwan Lee}
- Dionaea muscipula 'Wacky Traps' {Barry Meyers-Rice}

The names in the list above are all documented, registered and accepted by the International Carnivorous Plant Society, the International Cultivar Registration Authority for carnivorous plant cultivars.

Published but unregistered cultivar names include (name of nominant in braces):

- Dionaea muscipula 'Big Mouth' {Tony Camilleri}
- Dionaea muscipula 'Clumping Cultivar' {Peter D'Amato}
- Dionaea muscipula 'Dentate' {Peter D'Amato} [established as Dionaea muscipula 'Dentate Traps']
- Dionaea muscipula 'Dente' {Peter D'Amato} [established as Dionaea muscipula 'Dentate Traps']
- Dionaea muscipula 'Kinchyaku' {Katsuhiko Kondo}
- Dionaea muscipula 'Red Rosetted' {Peter D'Amato}
