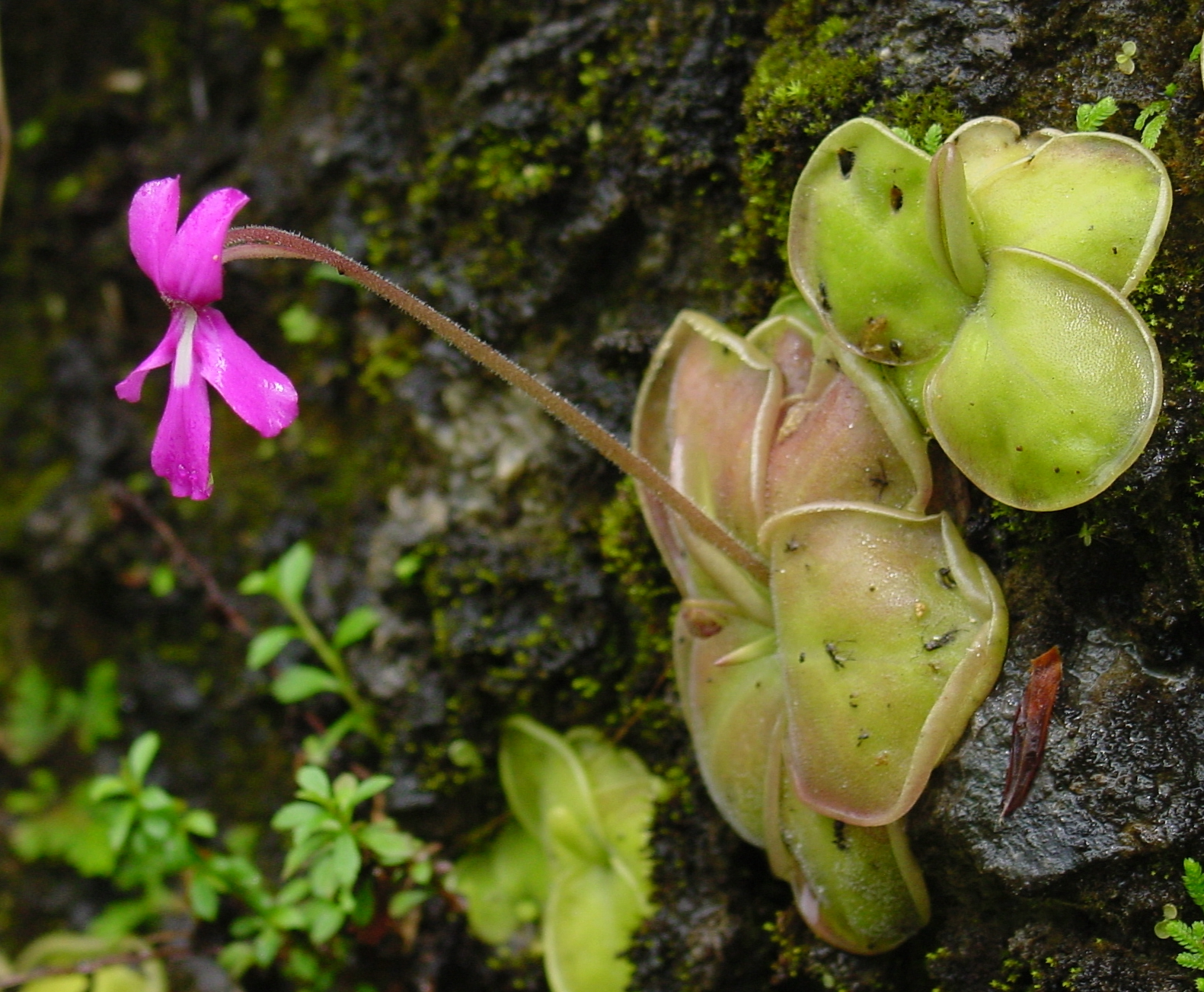
- In habitat in Oaxaca

Scientific classification
- Kingdom: Plantae
- Clade: Embryophytes
- Clade: Tracheophytes
- Clade: Angiosperms
- Clade: Eudicots
- Clade: Asterids
- Order: Lamiales
- Family: Lentibulariaceae
- Genus: Pinguicula
- Species: P. moranensis

Binomial name
- Pinguicula moranensis Kunth

Varieties
- P. moranensis var. moranensis P. moranensis var. neovolcanica

Synonyms
- According to Zamudio (2001) unless otherwise noted. P. moranensis var. moranensis: Pinguicula bakeriana Sander; Pinguicula caudata Schlechtendal; Pinguicula elliptica Sessé & Moc. ex Casper; Pinguicula flos-mulionis E. Morr.; Pinguicula kewensis Lavender; Pinguicula macrophylla auct. non Kunth: McVaugh & Mickel; Pinguicula mexicana Bonpl. ex Casper; Pinguicula purpusii Brandegee ex Purpus; Pinguicula rectifolia Speta et Fuchs, Phyton; Pinguicula rosei W.Watson; P. moranensis var. neovolcanica: Pinguicula orchidioides auct. non A.DC.: Hook.; Pinguicula sodalium Fourn.

= Pinguicula moranensis =

Species of insectivorous plant

Pinguicula moranensis /pɪŋˈɡwɪkjʊlə ˌmɒrəˈnɛnsɪs/ is a perennial rosette-forming insectivorous herb in the flowering plant family Lentibulariaceae. It is native to El Salvador, Guatemala, Honduras and Mexico. A species of butterwort, it forms summer rosettes of flat, succulent leaves up to 10 centimeters (4 in) long, which are covered in mucilaginous (sticky) glands that attract, trap, and digest arthropod prey. Nutrients derived from the prey are used to supplement the nutrient-poor substrate that the plant grows in. In the winter the plant forms a non-carnivorous rosette of small, fleshy leaves that conserves energy while food and moisture supplies are low. Single pink, purple, or violet flowers appear twice a year on upright stalks up to 25 centimeters (9.8 in) long.

The species was first collected by Humboldt and Bonpland on the outskirts of Mina de Morán in the Sierra de Pachuca of the modern-day Mexican state of Hidalgo on their Latin American expedition of 1799–1804. Based on these collections, Carl Sigismund Kunth described this species in Nova Genera et Species Plantarum in 1817. The extremely variable species has been redefined at least twice since, while several new species have been segregated from it based on various geographical or morphological distinctions, although the legitimacy of some of these is still debated. P. moranensis remains the most common and most widely distributed member of the Section Orcheosanthus. It has long been cultivated for its carnivorous nature and attractive flowers, and is one of the most common butterworts in cultivation.

The generic name Pinguicula is derived from the Latin pinguis (meaning "fat") due to the buttery texture of the surface of the carnivorous leaves. The specific epithet moranensis refers to its type location, Mina de Moran.

== Plant characteristics ==
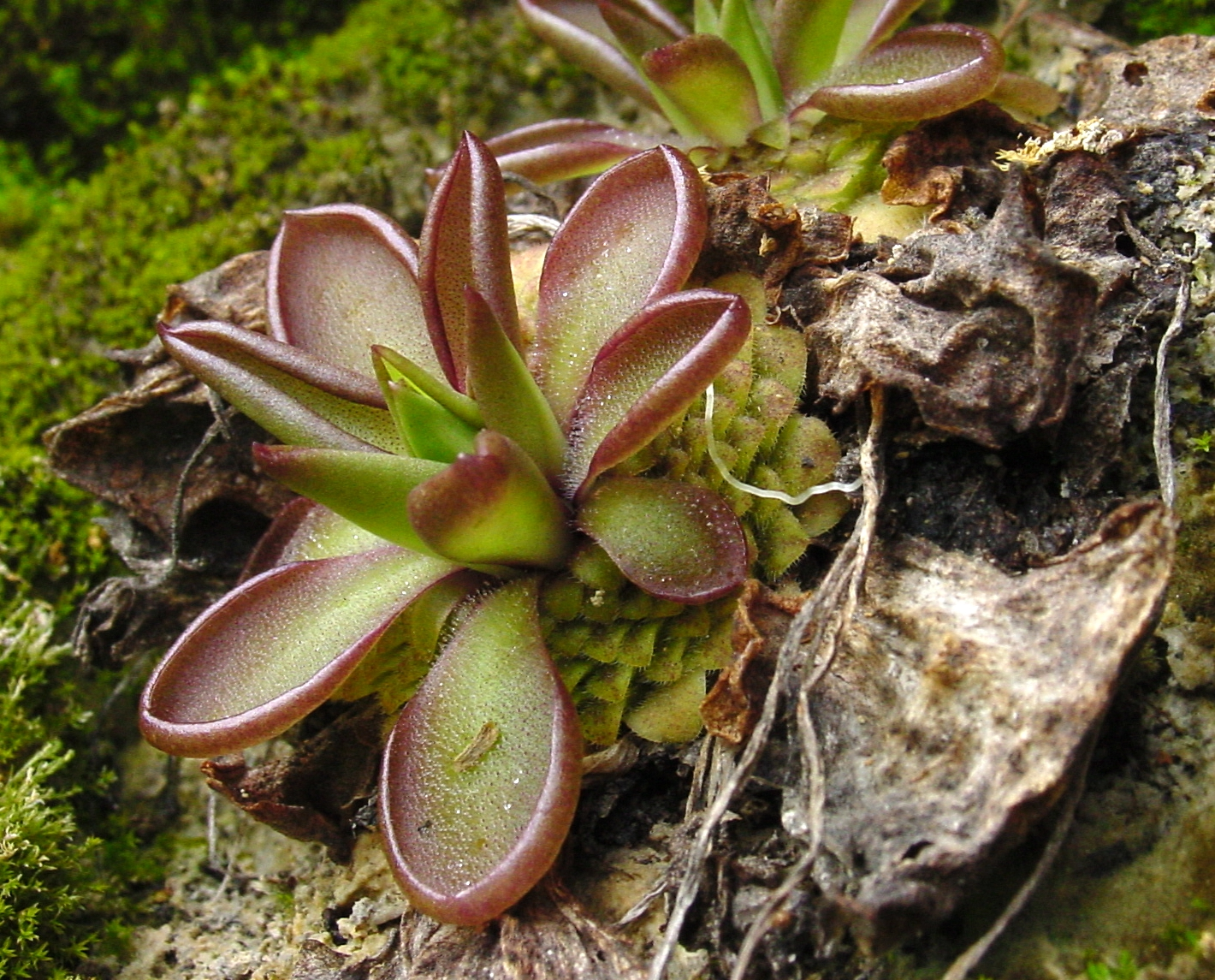
Summer rosette emerging from winter rosette

=== Habit ===
Pinguicula moranensis is seasonally dimorphic, in that it undergoes two distinct growth habits throughout the year. During the summer when rain and insect prey are most plentiful, the plant forms a ground hugging rosette composed of 6–8 generally obovate leaves, each up to 95 millimeters (3 3/4 in) long. These leaves are carnivorous, having a large surface area densely covered with stalked mucilaginous glands with which they attract, trap, and digest arthropod prey, most commonly flies. These so-called "summer leaves" are replaced by "winter rosettes" of small, glandless succulent leaves with the onset of the dry season in October. This protective winter rosette allows the plant to undergo winter dormancy until the first rains begin in May. Flowers born singly on upright 10–25 centimeters (4–10 in.) peduncles emerge twice during the year (from the summer rosette and again from the winter rosette), a feature rare among the Mexican species. In the summer these appear in June, peak in August and September, and disappear with the return to the winter rosette in October or November.

=== Leaves and carnivory ===
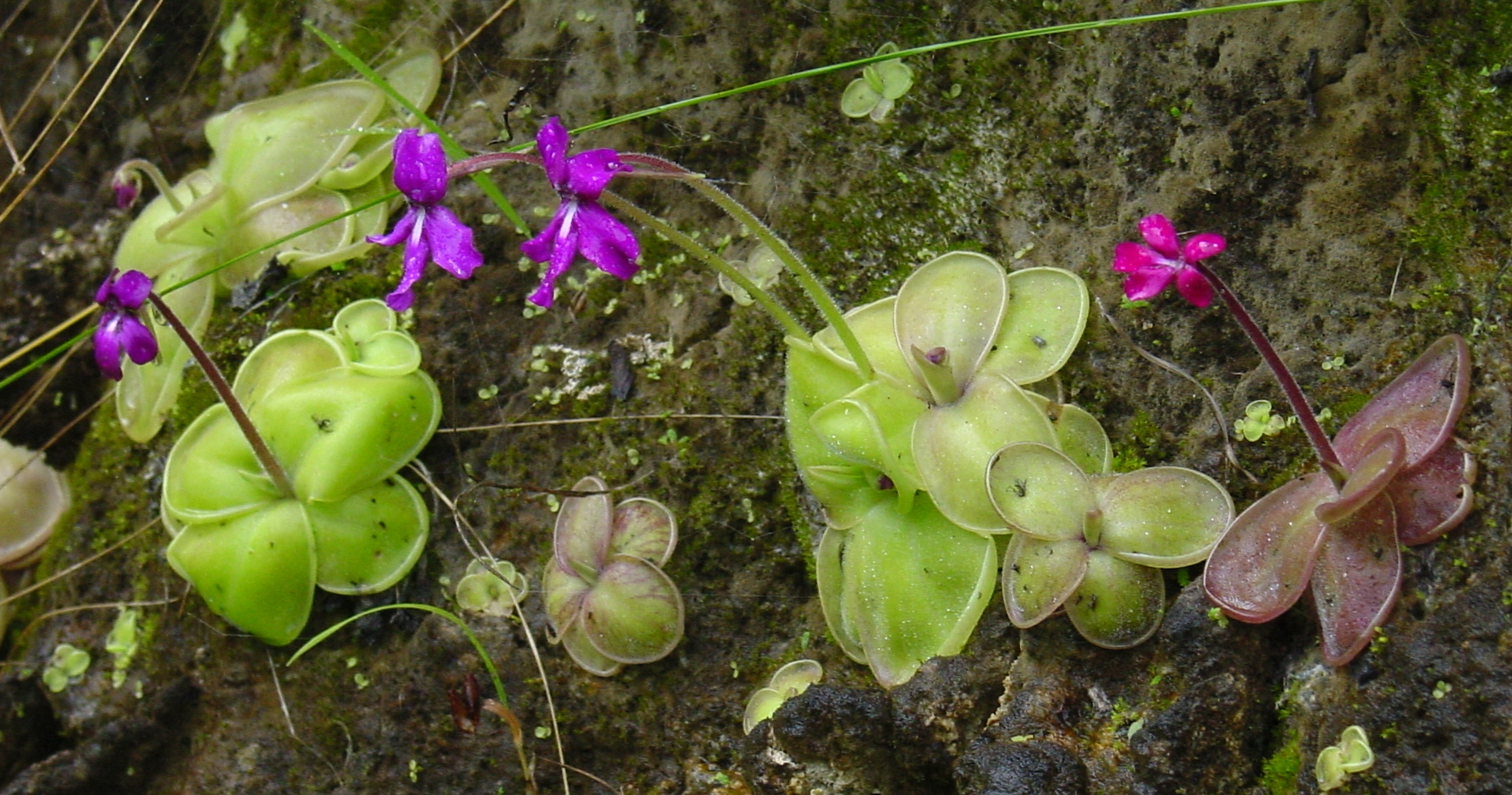
Leaf color can be variable, even within a population. Oaxaca, Mexico

The leaf blades of the summer rosettes of P. moranensis are smooth, rigid, and succulent, varying from bright yellow-green to maroon in colour. The laminae are generally obovate to orbicular, between 5.5 and 13 centimeters (2–5 in.) long and supported by a 1 to 3.5 centimetre (3/8–1 3/8 in.) petiole.

As with all members of the genus, these leaf blades are densely covered by peduncular (stalked) mucilaginous glands and sessile (flat) digestive glands. The peduncular glands consist of a few secretory cells on top of a single-celled stalk. These cells produce a mucilaginous secretion which forms visible droplets across the leaf surface. This wet appearance probably helps lure prey in search of water; a similar phenomenon is observed in the sundews. The droplets secrete only limited enzymes and serve mainly to entrap insects. On contact with an insect, the peduncular glands release additional mucilage from special reservoir cells located at the base of their stalks. The insect struggles, triggering more glands and encasing itself in mucilage. P. moranensis can bend its leaf edges slightly by thigmotropism, bringing additional glands into contact with the trapped insect. The sessile glands, which lie flat on the leaf surface, serve to digest the insect prey. Once the prey is entrapped by the peduncular glands and digestion begins, the initial flow of nitrogen triggers enzyme release by the sessile glands. These enzymes, which include amylase, esterase, phosphatase, protease, and ribonuclease break down the digestible components of the insect body. These fluids are then absorbed back into the leaf surface through cuticular holes, leaving only the chitin exoskeleton of the larger insects on the leaf surface.

The holes in the cuticle which allow for this digestive mechanism pose a challenge for the plant, since they serve as breaks in the cuticle (waxy layer) that protects the plant from desiccation. As a result, P. moranensis is usually found in relatively humid environments. The production of the stalked capture glands and sessile digestive glands is also costly. A recent study found that the density of these respective glands can be correlated to environmental gradients. For example, capture gland density was found to be highest where prey availability was low, whereas digestive glands density showed direct correlation to prey availability. These results suggest that the amount of investment in carnivorous features is an adaptation to the environmental gradients.

==== Winter rosette ====
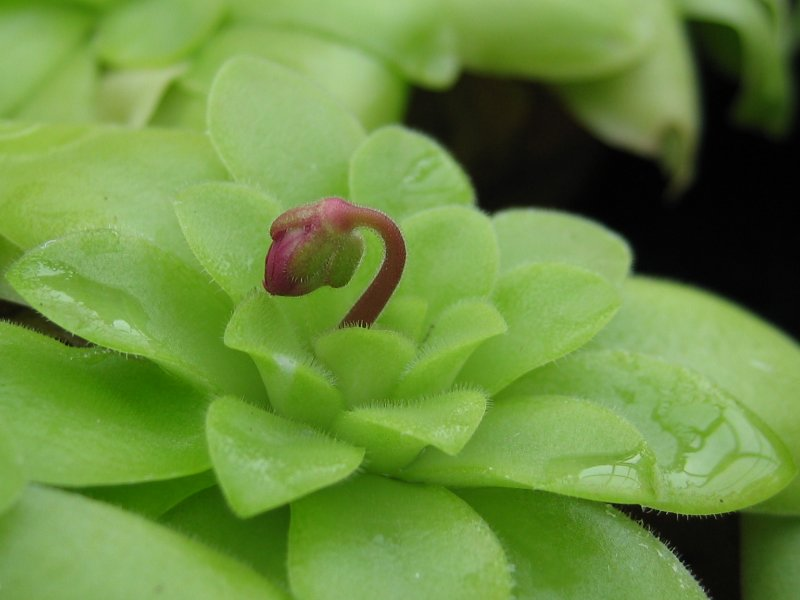
An inflorescence emerging from a winter rosette

The "winter" or "resting" rosette of P. moranensis is two to three (maximum five) centimeters (3/4–2 in.) in diameter and consists of 60 to 100 or more small, fleshy, non-glandular leaves. These are each 10 to 30 millimeters (3/8–1 1/4 in.) long and three to eight millimeters (1/8–5/16 in.) wide, generally spatulate or oblong-spatulate, and densely covered with fine hairs. The rosette is either open or compact and bulb-like, depending on variety (see below).

=== Flowers ===
Pinguicula moranensis produces one to seven flowers during each flowering period. These are borne singly on upright flower stalks which are green to brown-green in color and usually, like the upper surface of the carnivorous leaves, are densely covered in glandular hairs; the peduncles do, in fact, trap insect prey. The peduncles are 10 to 25 centimeters (4–10 in.) long and taper from two to three millimeters (1/8 in.) at the base to one millimeter (1/16 in.) at the top.

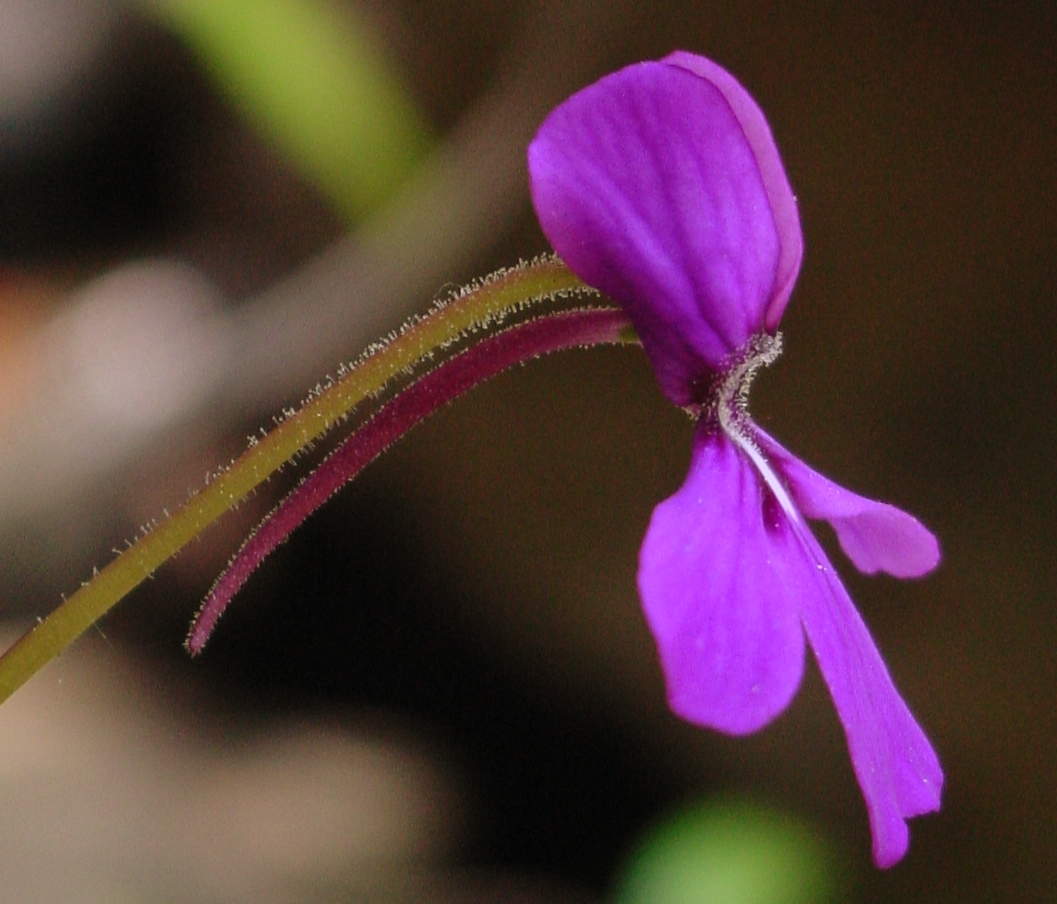
P. moranensis flower profile

The flowers themselves are composed of five petals which are fused at one end. The throat, the portion of the flower near the attachment point which holds the reproductive organs, is funnel shaped, and the petals flare out from there into a five-lobed zygomorphic corolla. The flowers 30 to 50 millimeters (1 1/4–2 in.) long. Below the attachment point to the stem the petals are fused into a 15–30 millimeter long spur which protrudes backwards roughly perpendicular to the rest of the flower.

The ovary and attached pistil protrude from the top of the floral tube near its opening, with the receptive stigma surface toward the front. Two 1 millimeter anthers hang from recurved, 2 millimeter filaments behind the pistil. Pollinators exiting after collecting nectar from the spur brush against the anther, transferring pollen to the stigma of the next flower they visit. The flowers can last up to 10 days but will wilt once they are pollinated. Pollinated ovaries ripen into 5 millimeter (3/16 in.) dehiscent seed capsules containing numerous 1 millimeter long seeds. The chromosome count for this species is 2n=44.

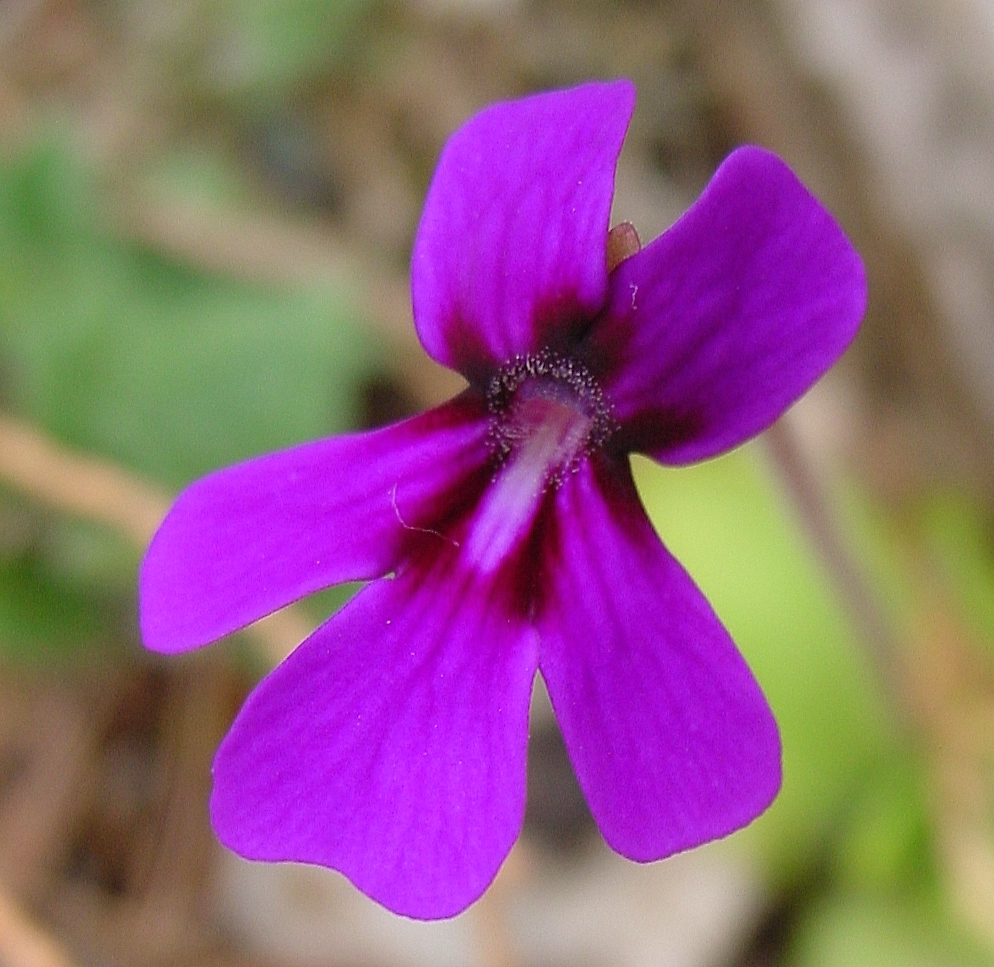
Flower form from Querétaro, Mexico

The color and morphology of the flowers of this species is extremely variable, a source of delight to the horticulturist and headache to the taxonomist. Some generalizations, however, can be made.

The corolla flares open into five lobes, two upper lobes and three lower lobes. The upper lobes are 7–16 millimeters (1/4–3/8 in.) long by 4–9 millimeters (5/32–3/8 in.) wide and generally oblong, obovate, or cuneate. The lower lobes are similarly shaped and are 7–20 millimeters (1/4–3/4 in.) long by 4–18 millimeters (5/32–3/4 in.) wide. The central lower lobe is usually slightly longer than its neighbors. All of the petal lobes have rounded ends. The floral tube that houses the reproductive organs and is visible at the base of corolla lobes is white or lilac in color and 4–6 millimeters (5/32–1/4 in.) long. The white color of the floral tube can extend to a variable distance onto the corolla lobes, particularly in a stripe on the lower middle lobe. The color of the corolla lobes generally varies from pink to purple, but has been described by collectors as being "purple, scarlet, rosy-lavender to bluish-purple, dark pink to lavender, pinkish-purple, deep violet-purple, dark purple, bright mauve-pink, bright purple-pink, magenta with [white eye], [and] reddish pale with white eye." A rare white-flowered form is also known.

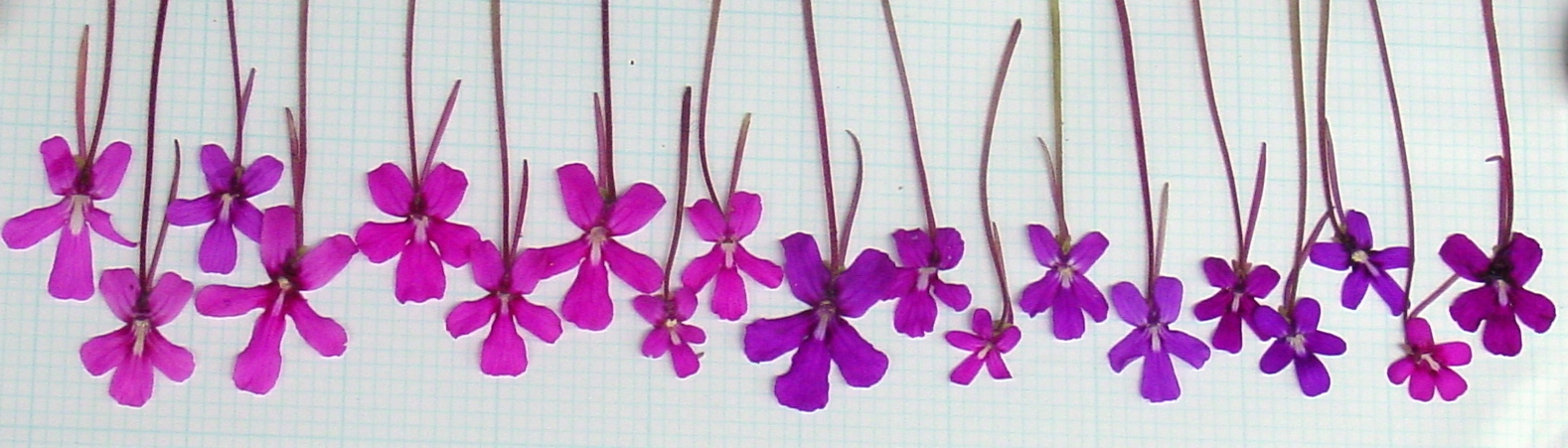
Flower color and morphology can vary greatly even within a population, an unusual feature in the species. This image shows variation in the size and shape of the white and dark markings, as well as the various petal shapes and sizes present. Oaxaca, Mexico.

== Taxonomy ==
Sergio Zamudio Ruiz, in his 2001 revision of the section Orcheosanthus, called the identity and exact delimitation of P. moranensis "perhaps the most difficult problem to solve within the genus". This difficulty is due mainly to the high variability and large geographic distribution of the species, which has given rise to the description of many synonyms since the species was first described nearly 200 years ago. Botanists have attempted to delimitate the species through various morphological, ecological and genetic methods, though to this date some debate remains as to the placement and description of P. moranensis and its relationship to the species to which it is closely related.

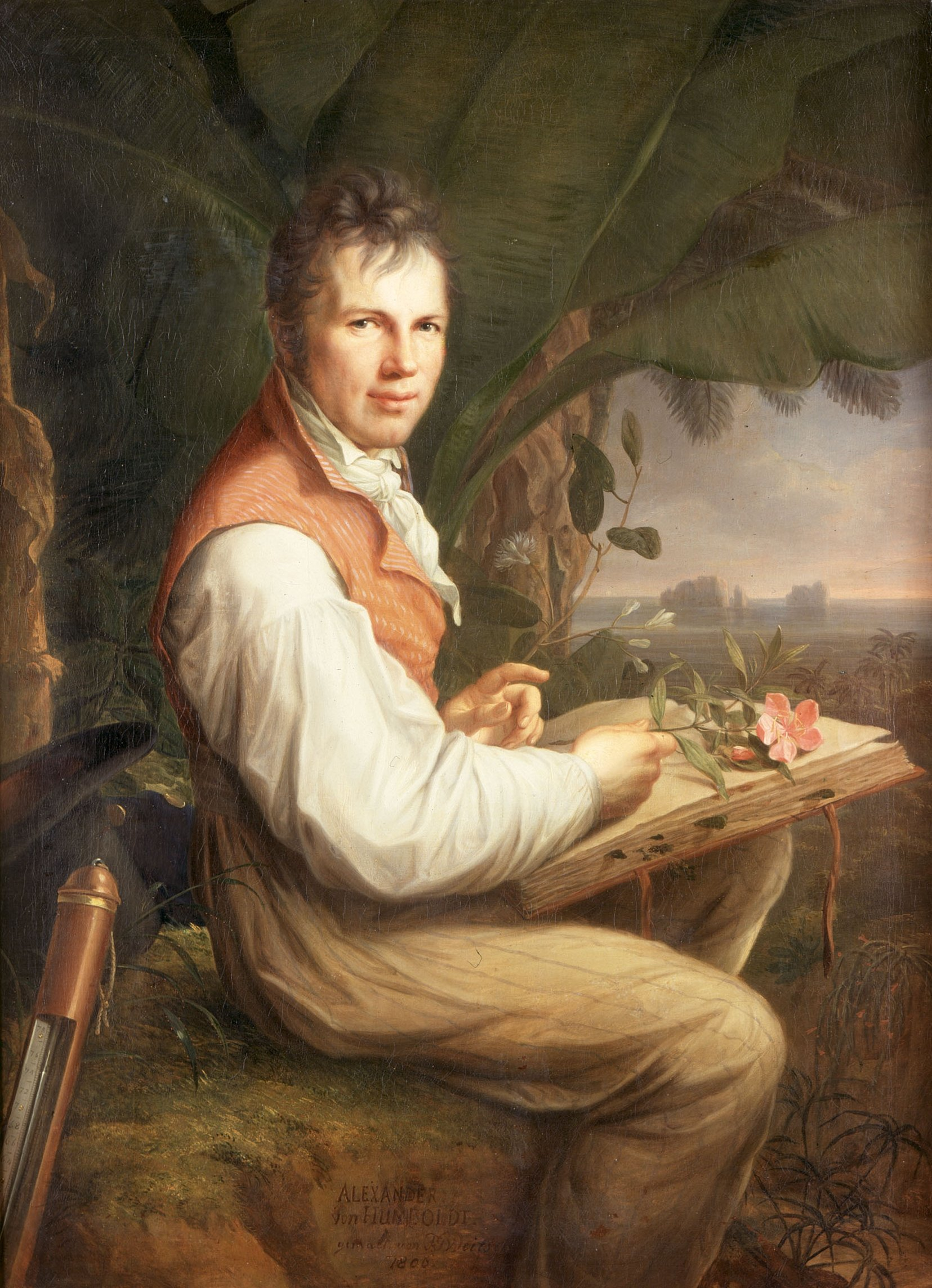
Alexander von Humboldt

=== Botanical history ===
Prior to Alexander von Humboldt and Aimé Bonpland's Latin American expedition in 1799–1804, only 8 Pinguicula species were known to science—5 from Europe, 2 from North America and P. involuta from Peru. From 1803 to 1805, three additional species from Europe and North America were described, bringing the total of known species to 11. In 1817, Carl Sigismund Kunth described 3 new species from Alexander von Humboldt and Aimé Bonpland's Latin American expedition: The Peruvian P. calyptrata and the first known Mexican species: P. macrophylla and P. moranensis. At this point no infrageneric classification had yet been suggested.

In 1844, a French-Swiss botanist by the name of Alphonse Pyrame de Candolle (who created the first Code of Botanical Nomenclature) proposed a division of the genus into three sections based on floral morphology. He placed in the section Orcheosanthus those species with purple, deeply bilabiate corollas with 5 sub-equal lobes, a short floral tube, and a large spur not protruding past this tube. He included four species in this section, all of them from Mexico: P. oblongiloba, P. orchidioides, P. caudata and P. moranensis. He excluded P. macrophylla H.B.K. on the grounds that it was a "dubious species".

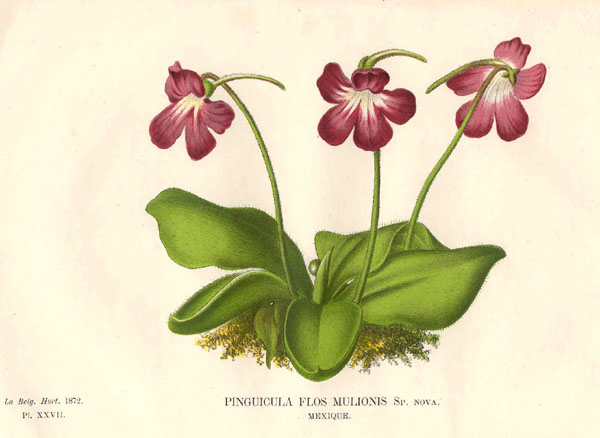
A print of P. caudata from Morren's work (1872)

The section Orcheosanthus grew as Charles Morren described P. flos-mulionis in 1872, Eugene Fournier added P. sodalium in 1873 and Sander proposed P. bakeriana in 1881. In 1879–1888, however, botanist William Hemsley, after studying multiple specimens in herbariums and in culture, came to the conclusion that all the taxa placed in the section Orcheosanthus up to that point belonged to the same single species. Due to doubts as to the identity of the original two species described by Kunth, Hemsley decided to use the name P. caudata Schltdl. for his conglomerate species. This name has been "indiscriminately" applied to members of the complex ever since.

==== Twentieth century ====
When Barnhart revised the family Lentibulariaceae in 1916, he recognized six species in the section Orcheosanthus, admitting however that this number was likely to change as others studied the section in the future. Sprague in 1928 proposed that the species joined by Hemsley were probably distinct, but that they were likely so interrelated that distinguishing between them would require observing characteristics that were usually or always indistinct in dried specimens. Sprague recognized eight species in the section: P. moranensis H.B.K, P. caudata Schltdl., P. oblongiloba, P. flos-mulionis, P. bakeriana, a P. moranensis-like P. rosei described by Watson in 1911, and the very distinct P. gypsicola.

In 1966, Casper published the first ever monograph of the genus. He clearly defined his taxonomic organization according to a broad range of morphological and phenotypic characteristics. Casper considered P. caudata, as well as various other taxa, to be synonyms of P. moranensis. He therefore recognized only 6 species for the section Orcheosanthus: P. moranensis, P. gypsicola, P. macrophylla H.B.K., P. oblongiloba, and the two recently discovered species P. colimensis and P. cyclosecta. Since that time 14 additional species have been discovered and assigned to the section. When Zamudio redefined the section in 1999, however, he chose to include only 12 species, including all six of Casper's choices. P. moranensis, therefore, remains in the section Orcheosanthus, along with over a dozen synonyms it has inherited in its 200-year taxonomic history.

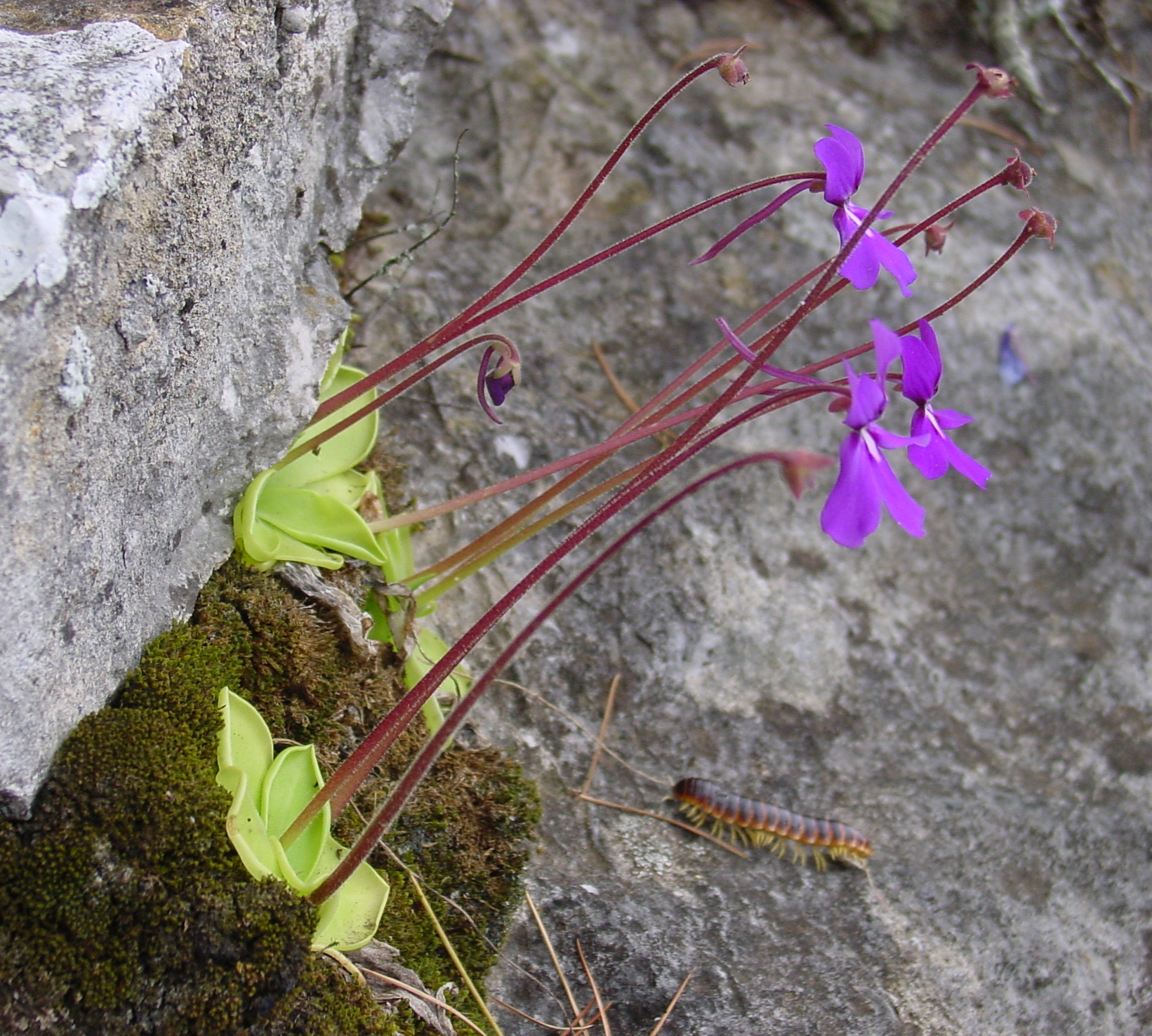
Phylogenetic studies take into account a broad range of plant characteristics, such as flowering time and morphology.

=== Phylogenetics ===
The varying importance which different authors have placed on various morphological characteristics when determining the taxonomy of the genus has long made the resulting subdivision of the genus a subject of controversy. Zamudio (2001) supported his revision of the section Orcheosanthus with a phylogenetic analysis, using 20 morphological and phenological characteristics. In 2005, Cieslak et al. conducted the first comprehensive phylogenetic analysis of the entire genus Pinguicula. Using molecular data, they were able to isolate those morphological characteristics that were synapomorphies for various groups, providing evidence for a genetically based taxonomic structure. Their overall results did not support the placement of P. moranensis in the section Orcheosanthus, rather indicating that it should be placed in the section Longitubus along with P. laueana.

In further disagreement with Zamudio's 2001 revision of the section Orcheosanthus, Cieslak et al.'s phylogenetic data indicated that P. rectifolia and several unnamed taxa that had been treated as synonyms of P. moranensis are in fact a distinct complex. They isolated several morphological characteristics that could be used to differentiate between the complexes, including floral spur length (longer in P. moranensis), flower color (never with a blue tinge in P. moranensis), and the shape of the lateral corolla lobe (exhibiting a twist in P. rectifolia). A more thorough study analyzing numerous P. moranensis populations and other members of closely related taxa is needed to resolve this complex.

=== Varieties ===
After extensively studying P. moranensis in habitat, Zamudio (1999) came to the conclusion that the species could be divided into two distinct varieties, mainly on the basis of the shape of the leaves composing their winter (resting) rosettes:

- Pinguicula moranensis Kunth in Humb., Bonpl. et Kunth. var. moranensis

This variety has open winter rosettes composed of leaves which are spatulate in shape and have an obtuse or rounded end. It tends to grow in limestone-based substrates.

- Pinguicula moranensis Kunth in Humb., Bonpl. et Kunth. var. neovolcanica

This variety has a closed, bulb-like rosette of winter leaves which are acicular (pointy) at the tip. It tends to grow on igneous substrates.

Zamudio also noted that these subspecies differed in their preference of soil substrate. He first noted this while attempting to find the population of plants from which Humboldt and Bonpland had collected their type specimens in 1803. Although Zamudio was able to find many populations of the species growing in the areas that Humboldt and Bonpland had visited in the vicinity if Mina de Moran, only one population, the only one growing on limestone, matched H.B.K.'s description and their type and isotype specimens now housed in the herbarium of the French national museum of natural history. The other populations in the area grew on substrate of igneous origin and more closely matched Hooker's 1846 description of P. orchidioides. These latter plants then became the new variety, P. moranensis ssp. neovolcanica.

== Distribution and habitat ==
Distribution of P. moranensis in Mexico and Guatemala

Pinguicula moranensis is the most widely distributed member of the Section Orcheosanthus. It is also the most common and widely distributed Pinguicula species in Mexico, being found in all the major mountain ranges except Sierra Madre Occidental and Baja California. Locations are known from the Mexican states of Tamaulipas, Guanajuato, Nuevo León, Campeche, Chiapas, Oaxaca, Puebla, Distrito Federal, Veracruz, México, Querétaro, San Luis Potosí, Morelos, Hidalgo, Guerrero, Zacatecas, Tlaxcala, Quintana Roo, and Michoacán and the Guatemalan departments of Huehuetenango, Quiché, San Marcos, Quetzaltenango, Totonicapán, Sololá, Chimaltenango, Baja Verapaz, Guatemala and El Progreso. Here it grows in mountainous regions between 800 and 3200 meters (2600–10500 ft) in altitude. Generally, the species tends to follow sedimentary outcrops of the Cretaceous period. P. moranensis var. neovolcanica, however, tends to grow on igneous rocks of the Trans-Mexican Volcanic Belt.

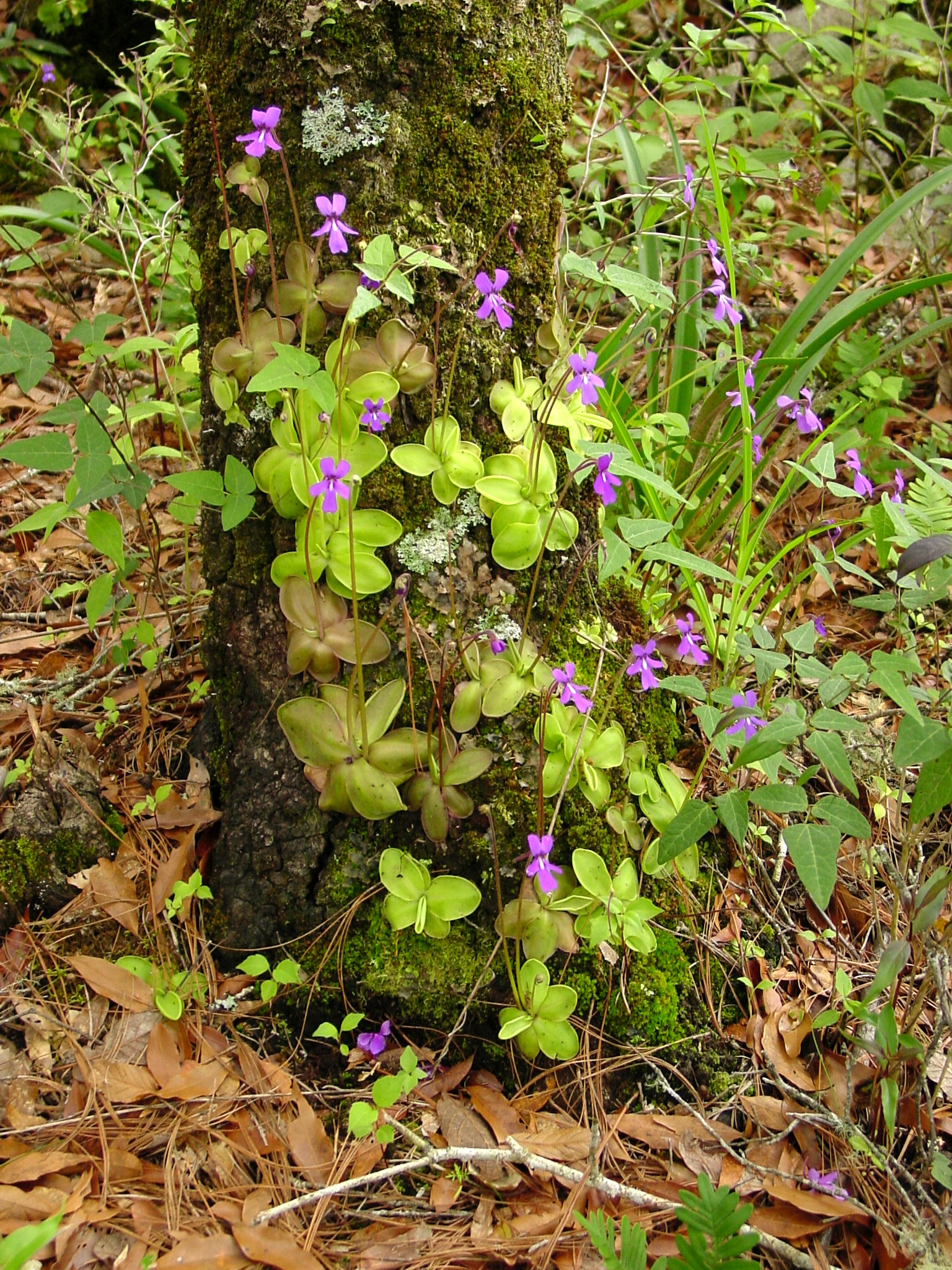
P. moranensis growing on a tree trunk in Tamaulipas

Pinguicula moranensis most often grows in oak, pine-oak, or temperate montane woodlands. However, its distribution penetrates into tropical forests and xerophytic shrublands, as well as in gorges and canyon walls with high environmental humidity. P. moranensis prefers humid and shady environments, such as slopes by streams, gullies, or road cuts, or among leaf litter in sandy soil high in organic matter. Its ability to gather nutrients from the arthropod prey it catches allows it to grow in low-nutrient environments where other plants would usually out-compete it. As a result, it is often found in disturbed areas or on steep cliffs or hillsides. Since its roots do little more than provide anchorage, the plant requires little or no soil, and dense clusters can be found clinging onto boulders, moss or crags in rock faces, or even epiphytically on tree trunks. Common companion plants include mosses, Selaginella, ferns and other herbaceous plants, as well as canopy trees such as pines and oaks.

== Cultivation ==
Pinguicula moranensis is one of the most popular and commonly cultivated Pinguicula, in part due to its large size, large and pretty flowers, and the ease with which it can be grown as a container plant. Most growers use an open soil mix composed of some combination of washed sand, perlite, vermiculite, peat moss, gypsum and/or decomposed granite. Soil should be kept well drained, but watered regularly with distilled water in the summer and only very rarely once the plant enters its winter rosette. The species grows readily on well-lit windowsills, under fluorescent lights, or in warm to hot greenhouses.

=== Hybrids and cultivars ===
Although no natural hybrids involving P. moranensis have been reported, the species is known to hybridize quite readily in cultivation. As a result, a number of cultivars involving the species have been registered and are recognized by the International Carnivorous Plant Society:

Hybrid cultivars involving Pinguicula moranensis
cultivar name	parentage	description
Pinguicula 'George Sargent' Hort. Slack	P. moranensis × gypsicola	Lilac flowers, strap-shaped leaves, large winter rosettes.
Pinguicula 'Hameln' Hort. Studnicka	P. gypsicola × moranensis	Wider, P. moranensis like foliage.
Pinguicula 'John Rizzi' Hort. D'Amato	P. moranensis × ?	Large, full flowers; oval, marginless undulating leaves.
Pinguicula 'L'Hautil' Hort. L.Legendre & S.Lavayssiere	P. (ehlersiae × moranensis) × moranensis	Two forms ("Grande" and "Petite"). P. 'Sethos' × P. 'Huahuapan'
Pinguicula 'Mitla' Hort. Studnicka	P. gypsicola × moranensis	Wider, P. moranensis like foliage.
Pinguicula 'Pirouette' Hort. J.Brittnacher, B.Meyers-Rice & L.Song	P. agnata × (moranensis × ehlersiae)	Hardy clone, attractive rosettes of pink leaves.
Pinguicula 'Sethos' Hort. Slack	P. ehlersiae × moranensis	Large flowers with a white star-like center.
Pinguicula 'Weser' Hort. Slack	P. moranensis × ehlersiae	Large flowers with single white streak down central lower lobe and dark veins.

Additionally, three clones of P. moranensis have been registered as cultivars:

Cultivars of Pinguicula moranensis
cultivar name	origin	description
Pinguicula 'Huahuapan' Hort. Slack	Huajuapan de León, Oaxaca, Mexico	Lilac-pink flowers with crimson touches at their base.
Pinguicula 'Libelulita' Hort. Rice & Salvia	southern Mexico	Square-tipped petals, pale purple at edges darkening to deep velvet-red near base, heavily veined, white center.
Pinguicula 'Vera Cruz' Hort. Slack	Veracruz, Mexico	Deep rose with basal markings.
