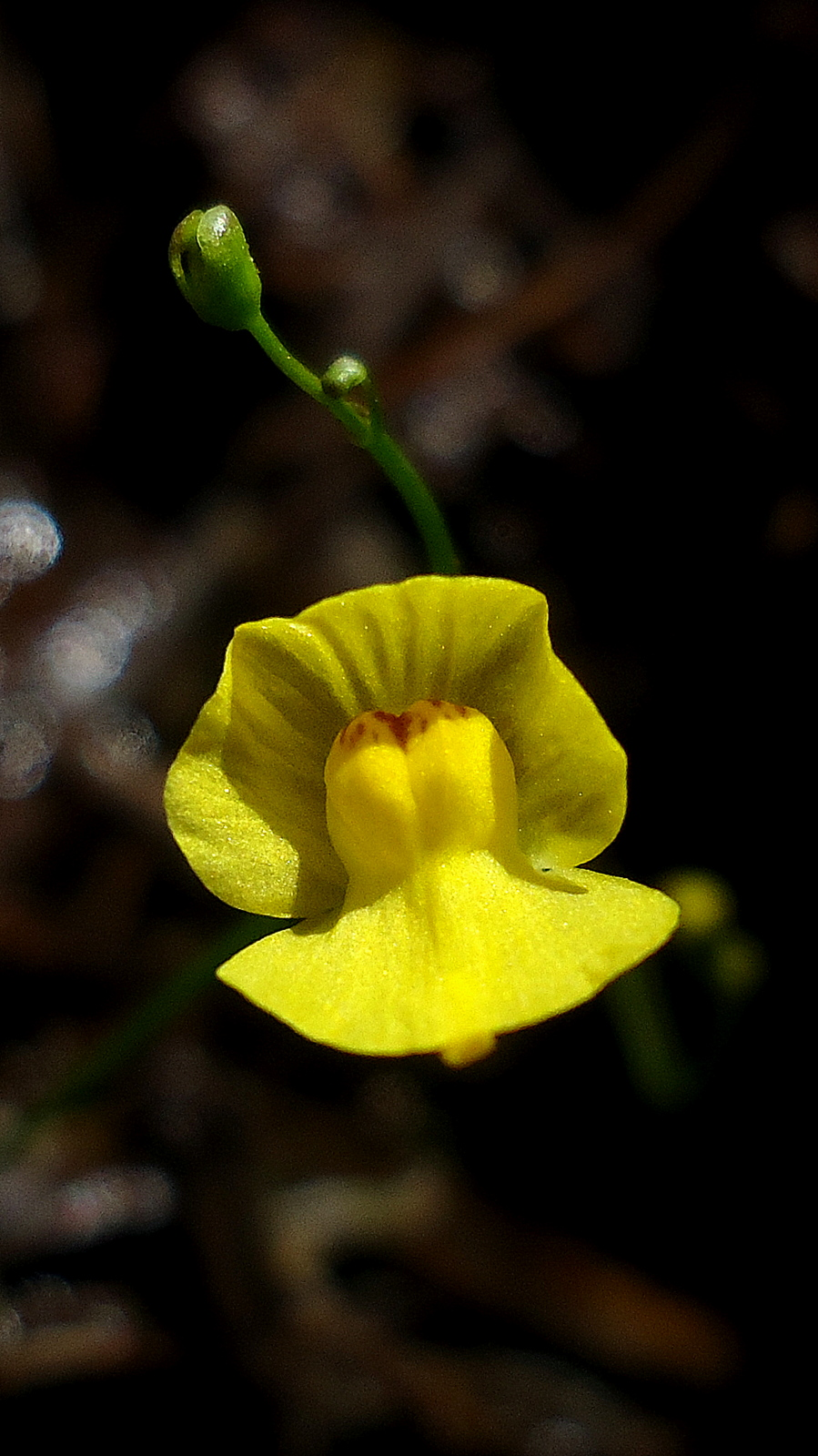

Conservation status
- Least Concern (IUCN 3.1)

Scientific classification
- Kingdom: Plantae
- Clade: Tracheophytes
- Clade: Angiosperms
- Clade: Eudicots
- Clade: Asterids
- Order: Lamiales
- Family: Lentibulariaceae
- Genus: Utricularia
- Subgenus: Utricularia subg. Utricularia
- Section: Utricularia sect. Utricularia
- Species: U. gibba

Binomial name
- Utricularia gibba L.

Synonyms
- Utricularia exoleta R. Br.

= Utricularia gibba =

Species of plant, Humped bladderwort

Utricularia gibba, commonly known as the humped bladderwort or floating bladderwort, is a small, mat-forming species of carnivorous aquatic bladderwort. It is found on all continents except Antarctica.

U. gibba has an exceptionally small genome for a plant, despite having a typical number of genes. The sequencing of its DNA revealed only 3% repetitive DNA material.

== Description ==
Utricularia gibba is an aquatic carnivorous plant that belongs to the genus Utricularia, or bladderworts. The specific epithet gibba is Latin for "hump" or "swelling" – a reference to the inflated base of the lower lip of the corolla. It is a small- to medium-sized aquatic plant that can either be affixed to the substrate in shallow water or free-floating in the water column, however it will likely flower more if supported by a substrate beneath shallow water. It forms mats of criss-crossing, branching, thread-like stolons, each growing to approximately 20 cm (8 in) or longer and 0.2–1 mm thick. What are sometime described as leaves or leaf-like organs – the actual distinction is difficult in the reduced morphology – are numerous and scattered along the length of the stolons and are 0.5–1.5 cm (0.2–0.6 in) long with a very short dichotomous branching pattern toward the tip of anywhere from one to eight branches but usually not more than four. The bladder traps take the place of some of these distal branches on the leaf-like structures. The traps are ovoid and are attached to the leaf-like structure by a short stalk; each trap is 1–2.5 mm long and has two primary setiform branched appendages on top and some smaller appendages surrounded the entrance to the trap. The appendages are the trigger that sets the trap off and vacuums the prey that touched it into the bladder to be digested.

Inflorescences are erect and typically emerge from the water to about 20 cm (8 in) tall, though in some cases they can be submerged and produce cleistogamous flowers. Inflorescences can produce anywhere from one to twelve flowers but it is unusual to see anything other than two to six flowers per inflorescence. Individual flowers are yellow, often with reddish-brown nerves, and are split into two lips: the upper lip is almost circular and weakly separated into three lobes while the lower lip is slightly smaller, also circular, and has a rounded, bilobed swelling in the center. The spur is narrowly conical or cylindrical and curves down below the flower, varying in length from being just shorter than to noticeably longer than the lower lip. Utricularia gibba will flower throughout the year whenever conditions are favorable. Flowers, specifically the corolla, vary in size across this species' large distribution from 0.8 to 1.5 cm (0.3 to 0.6 in).

The diploid chromosome number for U. gibba is 2n = 28.

== Distribution and habitat ==
Utricularia gibba has a vast geographic range and is native to the eastern United States, southeastern Canada, Central America, the Caribbean, the western Mediterranean, Southern Africa and southern India. It is considered an invasive species in Hawaiʻi, Australia, Japan, Brazil, New Zealand, Singapore, Serbia, Hungary and the United Kingdom.

It grows in ponds and lakes or shallow water in ditches, pools, bogs, swamps, and marshes that may be still or slowly flowing. It can sometimes be found growing in deep water but will not flower unless the inflorescences are supported near the surface by living or dead vegetation. The waters in which it grows are typically poor in available phosphorus and nitrogen.

== Genetic efficiency ==
In 2013, the genome of U. gibba was sequenced. At only 82 megabases, the genome is exceptionally small for a multicellular plant and the main difference between other plant genomes and that of U. gibba is a drastic reduction in non-coding DNA. The discovery casts doubt on the idea that repetitive, non-coding DNA, popularly known as junk DNA, is necessary for life.

Utricularia gibba and the tomato split from a common ancestor approximately 87 million years ago. Since that time, both plants have experienced episodes of whole genome duplication (WGD) in which the plants' DNA content doubled in size. Since then, it has lost most unneeded DNA, unlike the tomato, and now has a genome only a tenth as long as the tomato's.

Compared to Arabidopsis, the introns of Utricularia gibba are somewhat fewer in number per gene, and conserved cis-acting elements of its promoters are compressed. Most critical genes have returned to single copy status. However, the mitochondrial and plastid genomes of U. gibba do not appear to be compressed relative to those of other angiosperms. The compression of its nuclear DNA is thought to have occurred via both numerous microdeletions and some large-scale recombinant deletions. The presence of numerous GC-rich sequences throughout the nuclear genome of U. gibba is considered to have created a molecular mechanistic bias in favor of deletions, but this does not preclude the presence of a selection pressure to preserve such deletions.

It has been proposed that an increased mutation rate due to greater environmental mutagen exposure could have increased natural selection for loss of unneeded DNA, but no evidence for this was found in the relative mutational diversities of U. gibba and Arabidopsis.

It is possible that the genome duplication events and low-phosphorus environment acted in concert with one another: that the three whole genome duplications that occurred in U. gibba enabled the selective pressure of a phosphorus-poor environment to reduce total DNA without the deletion of important genes.

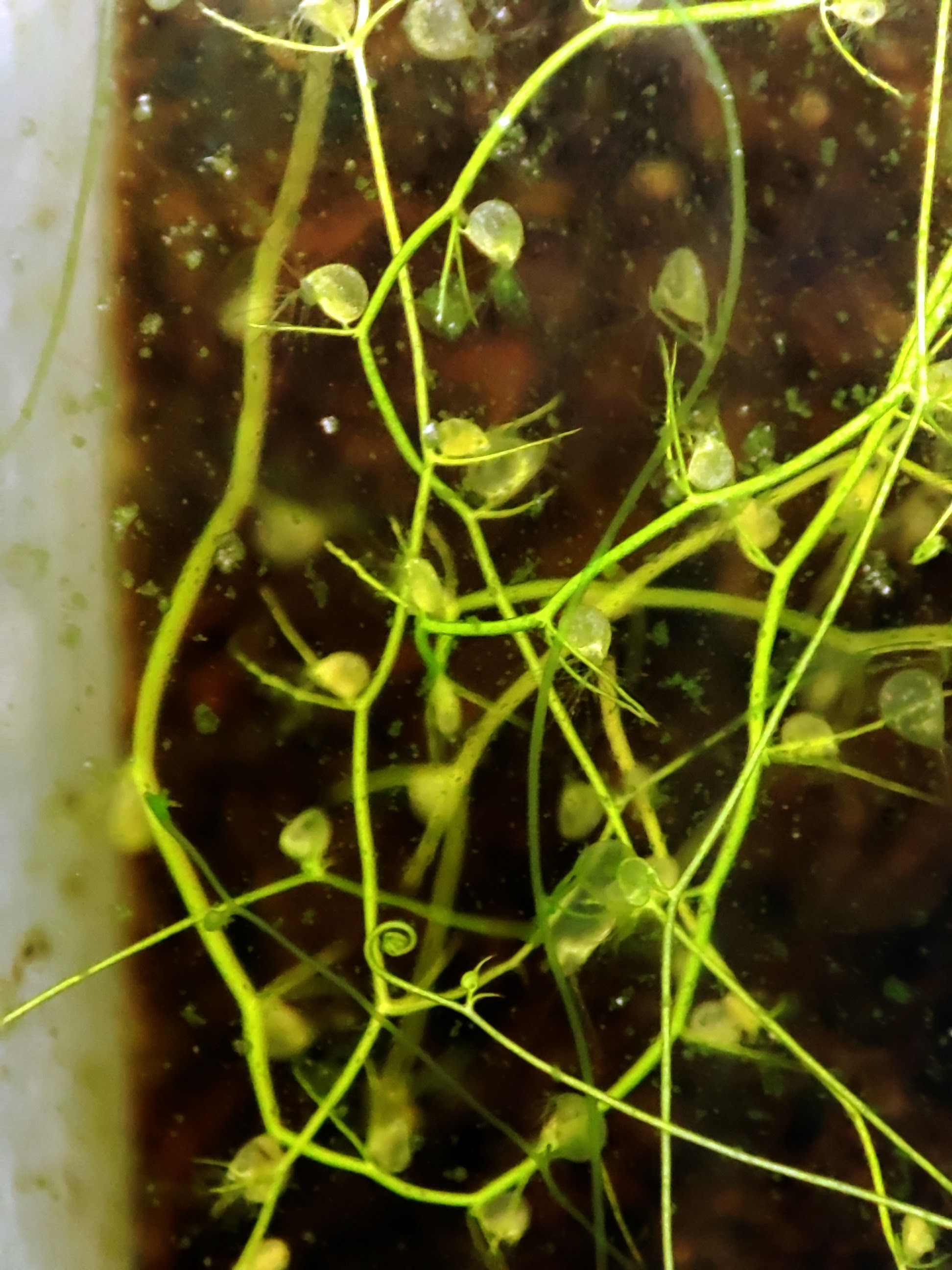
Stolons and traps feeding on algae Scenedesmus (green dots)

== Cultivation ==
Utricularia gibba has the reputation of being one of the easier aquatic bladderworts to grow, often being described as a weed in cultivation. In his 1998 book The Savage Garden: Cultivating Carnivorous Plants, Peter D'Amato advised that successful cultivation could be achieved with U. gibba floating in a small cup or bowl, within waterlogged peat, or even among the water-filled trays of other plants. It can also easily be grown in aquaria.

== See also ==
- List of Utricularia species
