= The Savage Garden: Cultivating Carnivorous Plants =

1998 book by Peter D'Amato

- Cover of first edition, showing a Sarracenia
- Author: Peter D'Amato
- Language: English
- Publisher: Ten Speed Press
- Publication date: May 1, 1998 (reprinted in 2004); July 2, 2013 (revised edition)
- Media type: Print (softcover)
- Pages: xxii + 314 (first edition) x + 374 (revised edition)
- ISBN: 0-89815-915-6
- OCLC: 473718060

Cover of the revised edition.

The Savage Garden: Cultivating Carnivorous Plants is a carnivorous plant cultivation guide by Peter D'Amato, horticulturist and owner of California Carnivores nursery. It was originally published in 1998 by Ten Speed Press, and reprinted in 2004. A revised edition was released in July 2013.

The book won the American Horticultural Society Annual Book Award and the Quill & Trowel Award from the Garden Writers Association of America, both in 1999. It has been called "the carnivorous-plant grower's bible" and had sold 25,000 copies as of 2002.

== Reviews ==
Barry Rice reviewed the book for the September 1998 issue of the Carnivorous Plant Newsletter:

There are already several full-sized books on growing carnivorous plants. Granted, Slack's works are very hard to find, but Cheers wrote a fine volume. Do we really need another? In answer, I tell you to run, not walk, to the nearest bookseller and buy D'Amato's new book, The Savage Garden.

Rice praised the book's cultivation information, writing: "At no point did I disagree substantially with his cultivation prescriptions—with thirty years of experience, he knows his subject matter." He added that "what really sets D'Amato's book apart is his ability to bring across a sense of gothic fun". However, he identified a number of errors in the text:

The Savage Garden does have flaws. Some are minor but oddly consistent spelling errors (e.g. "N. bicalcurata," "U. reinformis," "U. humboltii," "thripes," and others). More significant is D'Amato's confusing use of a flurry of unpublished cultivar names. It is hoped these are mended in future editions.

Rice concluded: "The Savage Garden is informative, accurate, entertaining, and at $19.95 it is a bargain."

A reviewer for the American Horticultural Society wrote of The Savage Garden: "D’Amato writes with authority, passion, and humor—a winning combination." The Los Angeles Times called it an "exhaustive work". Jerry Williams of the Richmond Times-Dispatch also gave a positive appraisal of the book.
