= Barry Rice =

Barry Rice may refer to:

- Barry Rice (botanist), carnivorous plant grower and the author of the book Growing Carnivorous Plants
- Barry Rice (soccer) (born 1987), American soccer player
