= Dionaea muscipula 'Bohemian Garnet' =

Cultivar of carnivorous plant

Bohemian Garnet
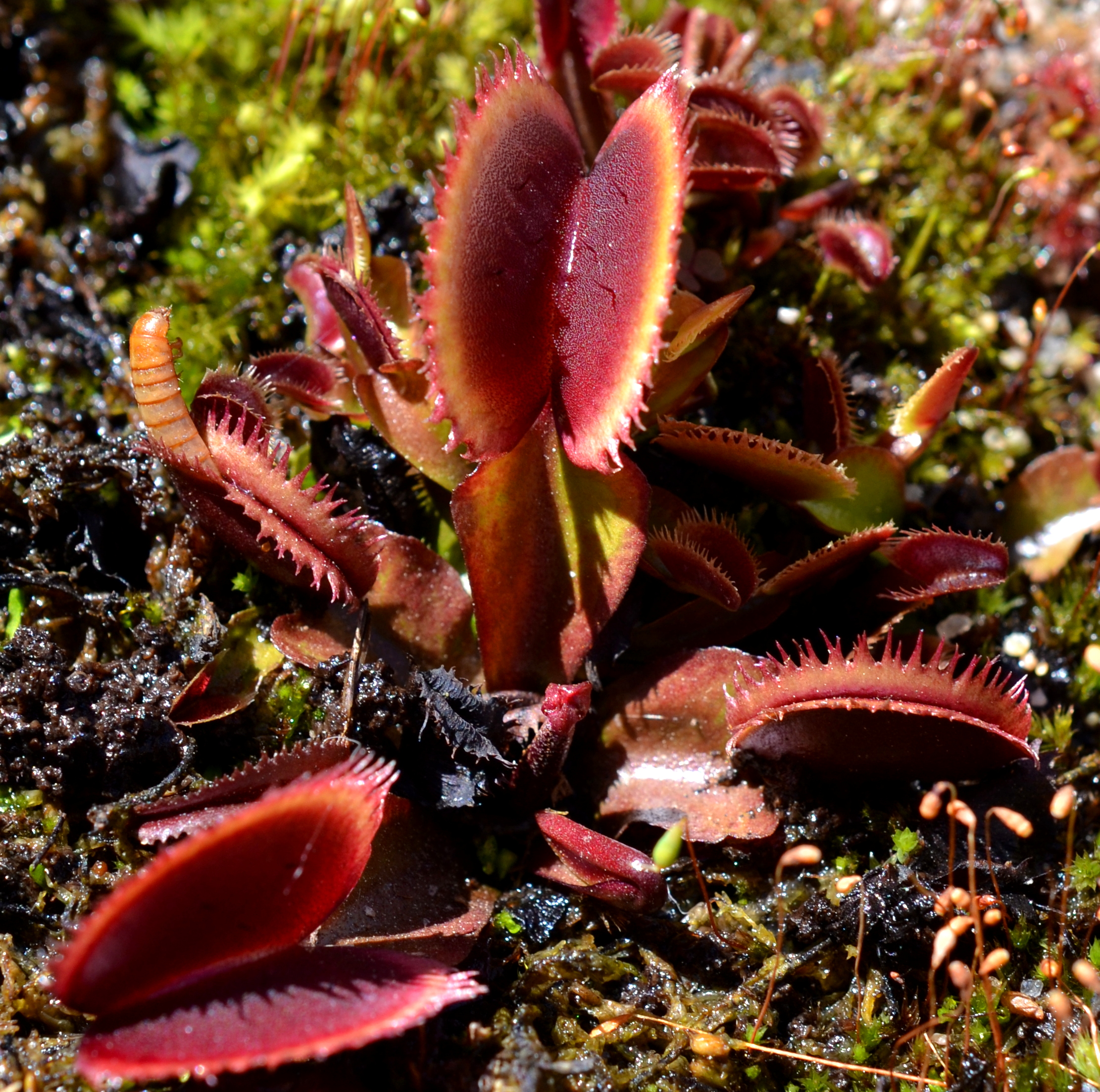
- Species: Dionaea muscipula
- Cultivar: 'Bohemian Garnet'
- Origin: Czech Republic

Dionaea muscipula 'Bohemian Garnet' is a cultivar of Dionaea muscipula, the Venus flytrap. It is an F2 cross between Dionaea 'Royal Red' and Dionaea 'Sawtooth' that was published in the September 2007 issue of the Carnivorous Plant Newsletter. In the description of this cultivar, Miroslav Srba noted that it maintains the red coloration of the 'Royal Red' cultivar and most morphological characteristics of 'Sawtooth'. Srba also detailed the smaller size at just 4-6 cm across and the production of many offshoots as novel characteristics that warrant cultivar status. The cultivar name was coined by Srba to honor the country of origin, the Czech Republic (Bohemia), and can be written as Dionaea 'Český Granát'.
