= California Carnivores =

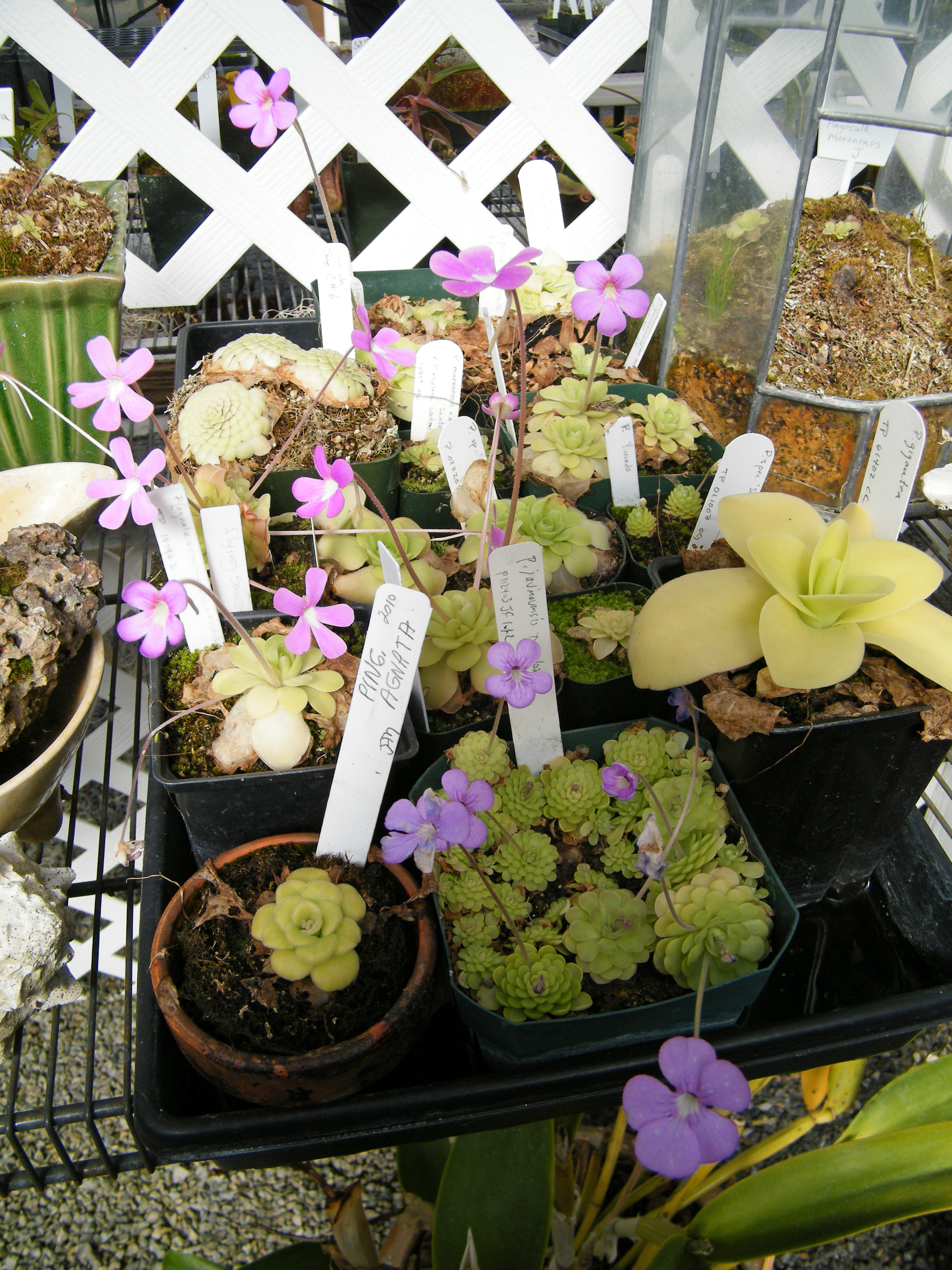
- Carnivorous butterwort plants (Pinguicula) in bloom at California Carnivores
- Company type: Private
- Industry: Gardening
- Headquarters: Sebastopol, California
- Products: Carnivorous plants
- Owner: Peter D'Amato
- Website: www.californiacarnivores.com

California Carnivores is a plant nursery in Sebastopol, California in the United States. Specializing in the cultivation of carnivorous plants, CC is home to one of the largest collections of imported carnivorous plants in North America, and possibly the world, with more than 1,000 types of imported plant and dozen of varieties for sale in the retail section of the nursery.

== Owner ==
CC is owned by horticulturist Peter D'Amato, carnivorous plant expert and author of The Savage Garden: Cultivating Carnivorous Plants. He operates the nursery alongside co-owner and chief plant propagator, Damon Collingsworth. Collingsworth also curated all of the photos in the revised edition of The Savage Garden.

== Public displays ==
CC also provides consultation and plants for both temporary and permanent public exhibitions of carnivorous plants at museums, botanical gardens, and plant shows. Carnivorous plant exhibits at the San Antonio Botanical Garden and the San Francisco Conservatory of Flowers have featured plants grown and provided by California Carnivores in their exhibits.

== See also ==
- International Carnivorous Plant Society
- North American Sarracenia Conservancy
