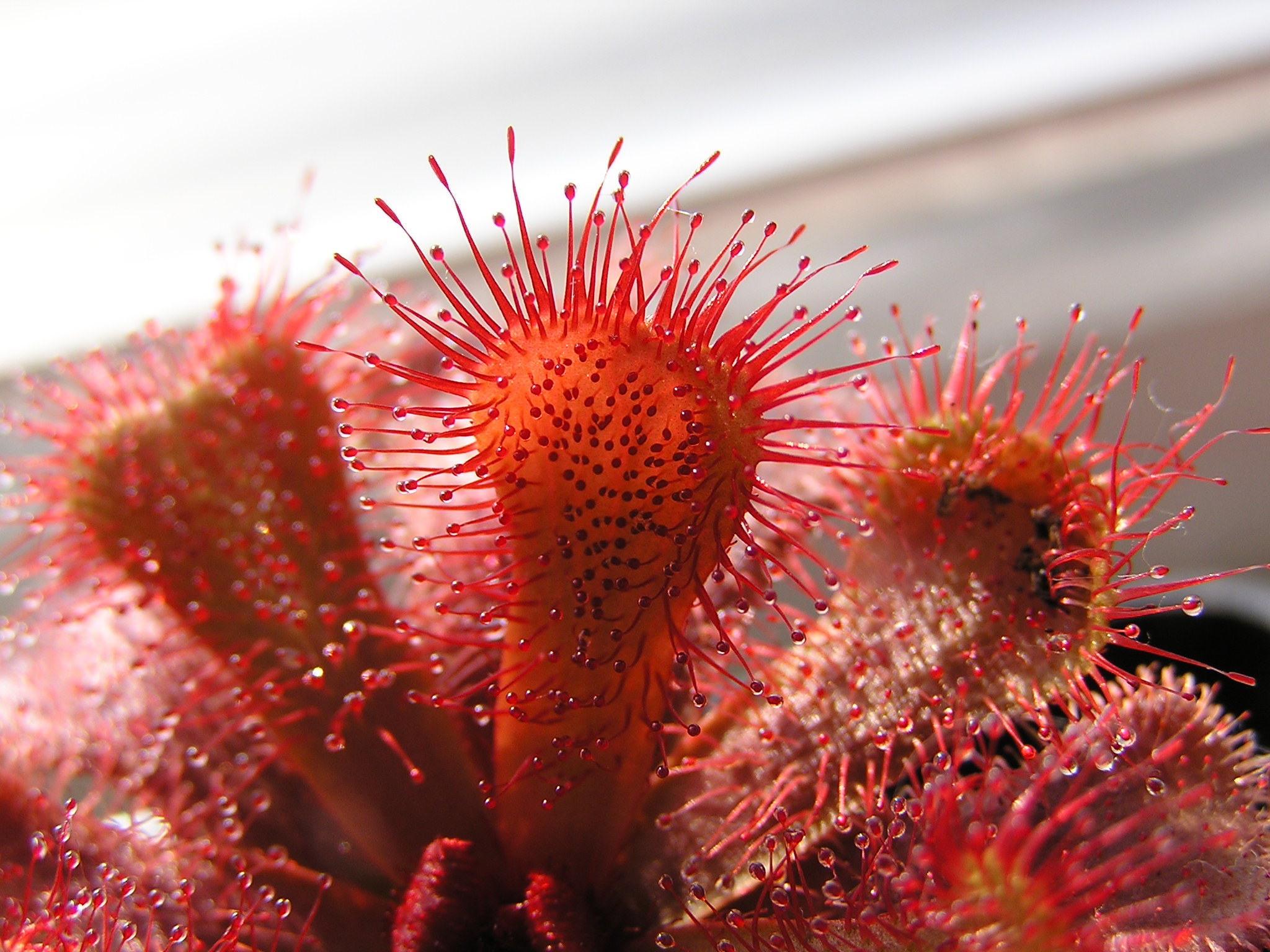

Scientific classification
- Kingdom: Plantae
- Clade: Tracheophytes
- Clade: Angiosperms
- Clade: Eudicots
- Order: Caryophyllales
- Family: Droseraceae
- Genus: Drosera
- Subgenus: Drosera subg. Drosera
- Section: Drosera sect. Drosera
- Species: D. slackii

Binomial name
- Drosera slackii Cheek

= Drosera slackii =

Species of carnivorous plant

Drosera slackii is a subtropical sundew native to the Cape Provinces of South Africa. It forms rosettes that range from to two to four inches in diameter, and produces pink flowers. It is named after the British plantsman and author Adrian Slack (1933-2018).

Drosera slackii is a recipient of the Royal Horticultural Society's Award of Garden Merit.

== See also ==
- List of Drosera species
