= Dionaea muscipula 'Wacky Traps' =

Cultivar of carnivorous plant

Wacky Traps
- Species: Dionaea muscipula
- Cultivar: 'Wacky Traps'
- Origin: Cresco Nursery, Netherlands, 1996

Dionaea muscipula 'Wacky Traps' is a cultivar of Dionaea muscipula, the Venus flytrap. Dionaea muscipula 'Wacky Traps' was a clone produced by Cresco Nursery in the Netherlands through tissue culture. This particular clone was discovered in a tray of a bunch of mutants by Mike Ross. It has also been called "Bart Simpson," coined by Ed Read, because of the resemblance of the plant to the animated character's spiky hair. The plant is an extremely slow grower. It has abnormally thick traps and petioles, which are probably the reason why 'Wacky Traps' has trouble closing its traps quickly. It takes several minutes trap closure even with repeated teasing of the trigger hairs.

Robert Ziemer has tried unsuccessfully to sexually propagate Dionaea 'Wacky Traps'. He suggested that the stigma of the flower is deformed and unreceptive to pollen. He also states that the pollen appears to be normal.

The cultivar was formally registered with the International Carnivorous Plant Society on December 6, 2006, by Barry Rice.
