= Dionaea muscipula 'Fused Tooth' =

Tooth found in carnivorous plants

Fused Tooth
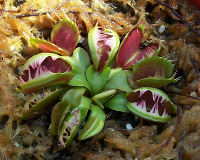
- Species: Dionaea muscipula
- Cultivar: 'Fused Tooth'
- Origin: Thomas Carow: Muennerstadt, Germany, 1990

Dionaea muscipula 'Fused Tooth' is a cultivar of Dionaea muscipula, the Venus flytrap. It has webbed teeth that appear in the summer.
