= Eugène Fournier =

French caver and geologist

Eugène Fournier (1871–1941) was a French caver and geologist.
