= Dionaea muscipula 'Sawtooth' =

Cultivar of carnivorous plant

Sawtooth
- Species: Dionaea muscipula
- Cultivar: 'Sawtooth'
- Origin: Unknown

Dionaea muscipula 'Sawtooth' is a cultivar of Dionaea muscipula, the Venus flytrap that has deeply divided "teeth". It was formally described and registered as a cultivar in 2000.

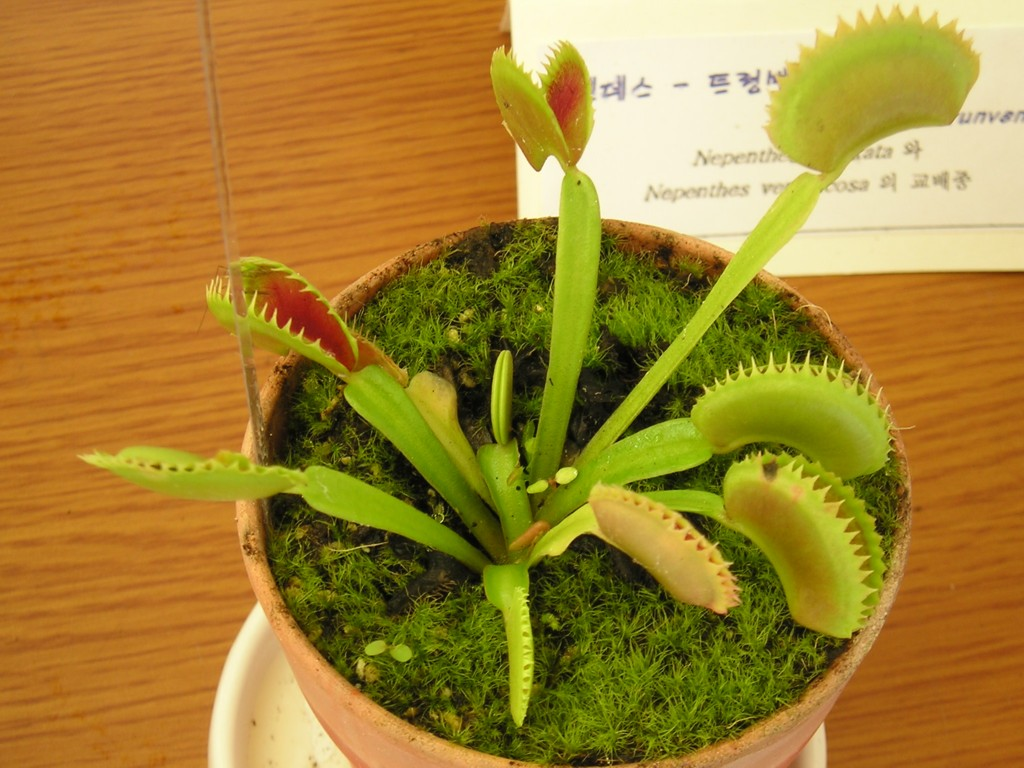
"Dentate" cultivar, a similar variety
