= Adrian Slack =

British botanist (1933–2018)

Adrian Slack (1933 – 3 June 2018) was a landscape gardener, plantsman, author and authority on carnivorous plants. He won 5 gold medals at the Chelsea Flower Show, and authored two books: Carnivorous Plants (1979, 2005) and Insect-Eating Plants and How to Grow Them (1986, 2006).

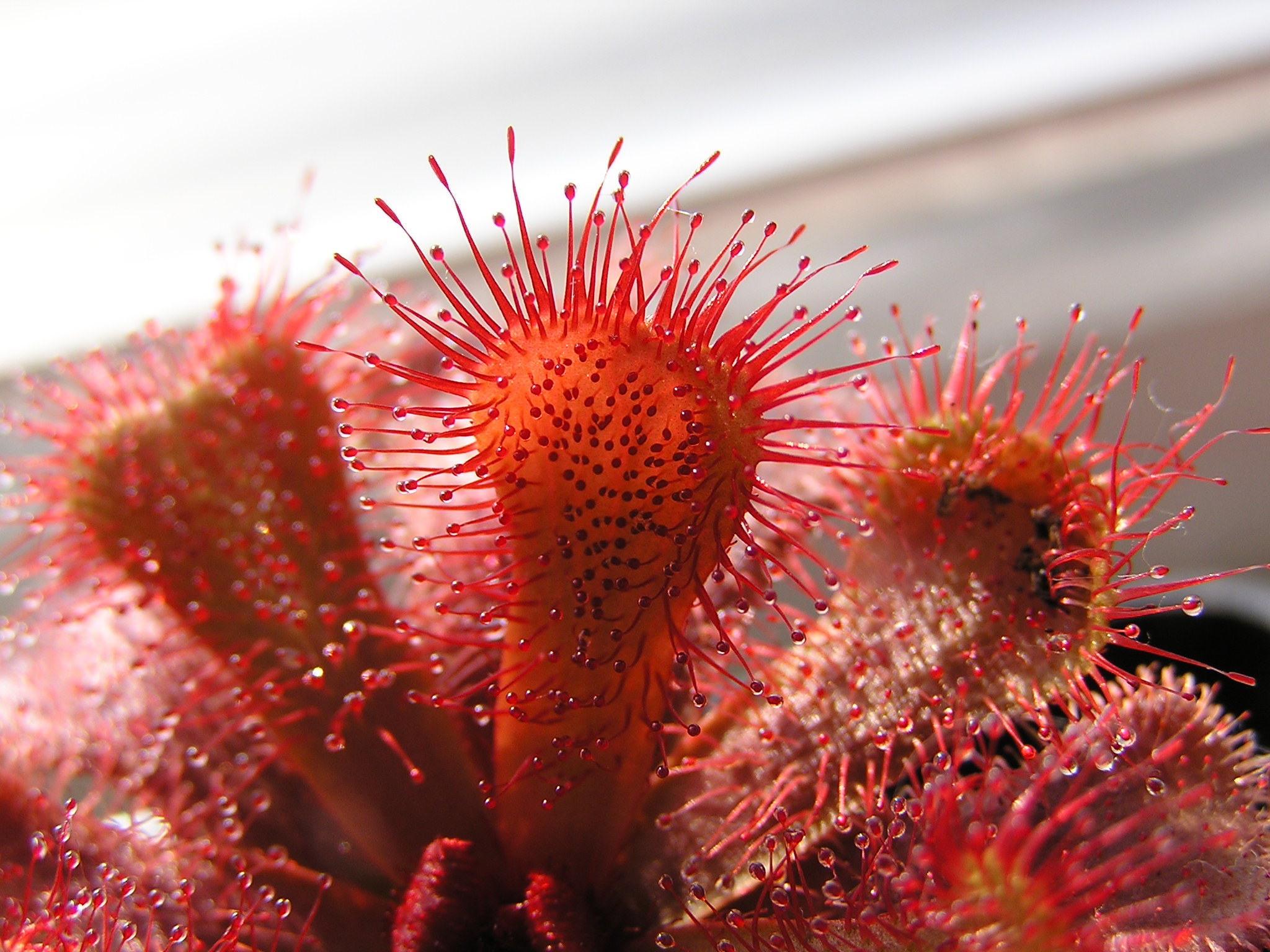
Drosera slackii

Both of Adrian Slack's books are considered to have excellent cultivation information and are highly regarded in the carnivorous plant community. After a long time out of print, both of them have recently been reissued. Slack developed hundreds of cultivars and many have been named after him. The sundew species Drosera slackii he cultivated was named in his honour.

Slack founded and ran Marston Exotics carnivorous plant nursery in England before suffering a stroke in 1986 that caused his early retirement.

Slack was featured on a 1981 episode of Nature Watch and in an accompanying book published the same year.
