= Peter D'Amato =

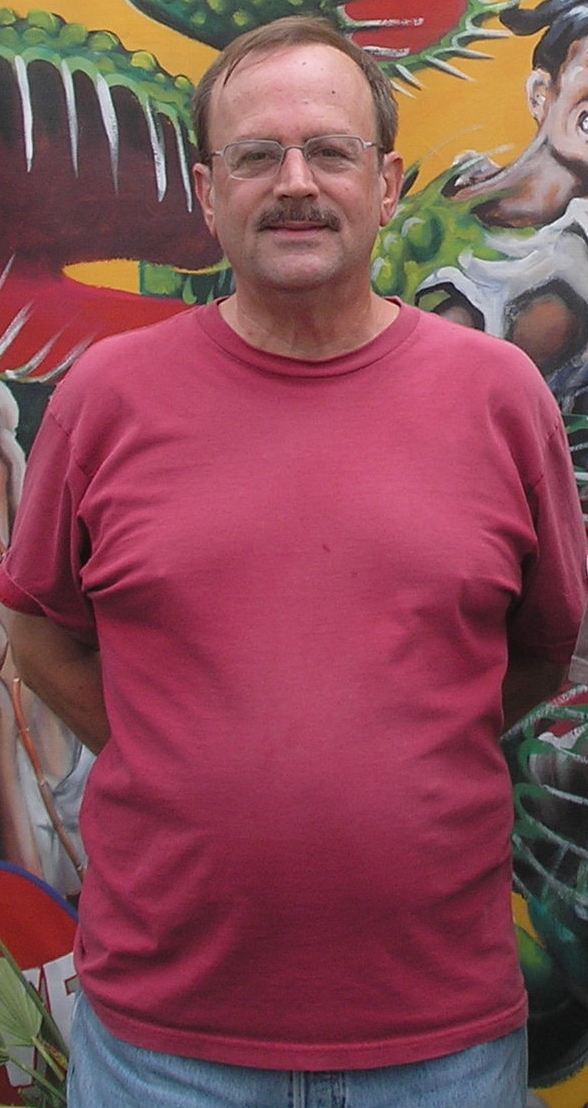
- Born: 4 April 1954; Bronx, New York
- Died: June 26, 2024 (aged 70)
- Occupations: Horticulturalist, author
- Known for: His expert knowledge on keeping carnivorous plants in cultivation, and his nursery, California Carnivores.
- Notable work: The Savage Garden: Cultivating Carnivorous Plants

Peter D'Amato (4 April 1954 – 26 June 2024) was an American author, businessman, and horticulturist specialising in carnivorous plants. He was the owner of California Carnivores, located in Sebastopol, possibly the largest nursery of carnivorous plants in the world, and the author of The Savage Garden (published 1998), a book on the cultivation of insectivorous plants. His book won the American Horticultural Society Book Award and the Quill & Trowel Award from the Garden Writers Association of America, both in 1999.

== Education ==
Peter graduated from high school in New Jersey in 1972 and attended the University of Miami, Florida, 1972–1974.

== Career ==
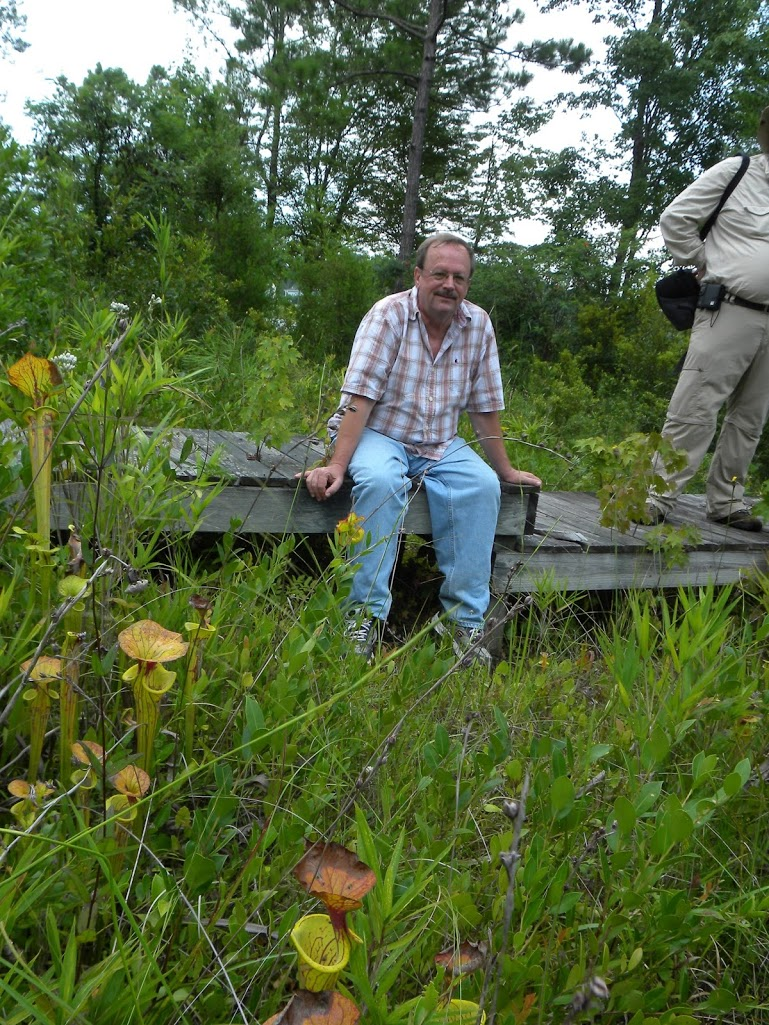
Peter D'Amato in a field of Sarracenia.

D'Amato grew carnivorous plants for almost 40 years. In 1989, he opened the California Carnivores plant nursery. D'Amato was also the co-founder of the Bay Area Carnivorous Plant Society along with frequently contributing to the International Carnivorous Plant Society's Carnivorous Plant Newsletter. Over the years, he wrote several articles and lectured on the subject.

D'Amato traveled all over the United States speaking and giving lectures to different groups. Some of the places he lectured at include:

- University of North Carolina's Botanical Garden
- Atlanta Botanical Garden
- California Horticultural Society
- University of California at Berkeley
- San Diego Zoo
- Fredrick Meijer Gardens (Grand Rapids)
- San Francisco Zoo

== Appearances ==
D'Amato appeared on a number of TV shows including:

- Home and Garden Network programs
- Martha Stewart Living
- Various travel and garden shows
