= Barry Rice (botanist) =

American botanist

Barry Rice is an American botanist, professional carnivorous plant grower and the author of the book Growing Carnivorous Plants. Barry Rice maintains the website Sarracenia.com and has a detailed FAQ on many carnivorous plant topics. He is co-editor of the International Carnivorous Plant Society's journal, the Carnivorous Plant Newsletter. He also works as an invasive species specialist under the Global Invasive species Team. Currently, he is focusing his research on Utricularia and its distribution in the western states. Another project that he also works on is the pollination of Darlingtonia californica. Rice is also a consultant for the Guinness Book of World Records.

Before Barry Rice became well known for his contribution to carnivorous plants, he was an astronomer. He was a researcher at Steward Observatory where his project focused on the star orientation of the Milky Way. His astronomy research focused on a young galactic cluster designated NGC 2264. Rice authored or co-authored the following publications: The Dusty Environment of the Young Galactic Cluster NGC 2264, A Calibrated System for Low Resolution Spectral Classification, and The Structure and Kinematics of Bipolar Outflows: Observations and Models of the Monoceros R2 Outflow.

== Bibliography ==
- Barry Rice. Growing Carnivorous Plants. Timber Press, Incorporated. ISBN 0-88192-807-0.
