= International Pinguicula Study Group Newsletter =

- Volume 10 (autumn 2000)
- Discipline: Botany
- Language: English
- Edited by: Stan Lampard

Publication details
- History: 1992?–2000
- Publisher: The International Pinguicula Study Group (United Kingdom)
- Frequency: Irregular

Standard abbreviations
- ISO 4: Int. Pinguicula Study Group Newsl.

Indexing
- OCLC no.: 183251653

Links
- Journal homepage

The International Pinguicula Study Group Newsletter was the official publication of the International Pinguicula Study Group, a Pinguicula society based in the United Kingdom that was active during the 1990s. Typical articles included matters of horticultural interest, field reports, and scientific studies. Only 10 issues were ever released and the newsletter had an irregular publication history. In chronological order, the 10 issues were: volume 1 (not dated), volume 2 (not dated), volume 3 (May/June 1993), volume 4 (February 1994), volume 5 (September 1994), volume 6 (April 1995), volume 7 (January 1996), volume 8 (February 1997), volume 9 (autumn 1998), and volume 10 (autumn 2000). The International Carnivorous Plant Society hosts an online archive of all ten issues.

== Taxon descriptions ==
The International Pinguicula Study Group Newsletter published the formal description of the subspecies Pinguicula macroceras subsp. nortensis in its February 1997 issue. It also established the cultivar name Pinguicula 'L'Hautil' in the May/June 1993 issue.
