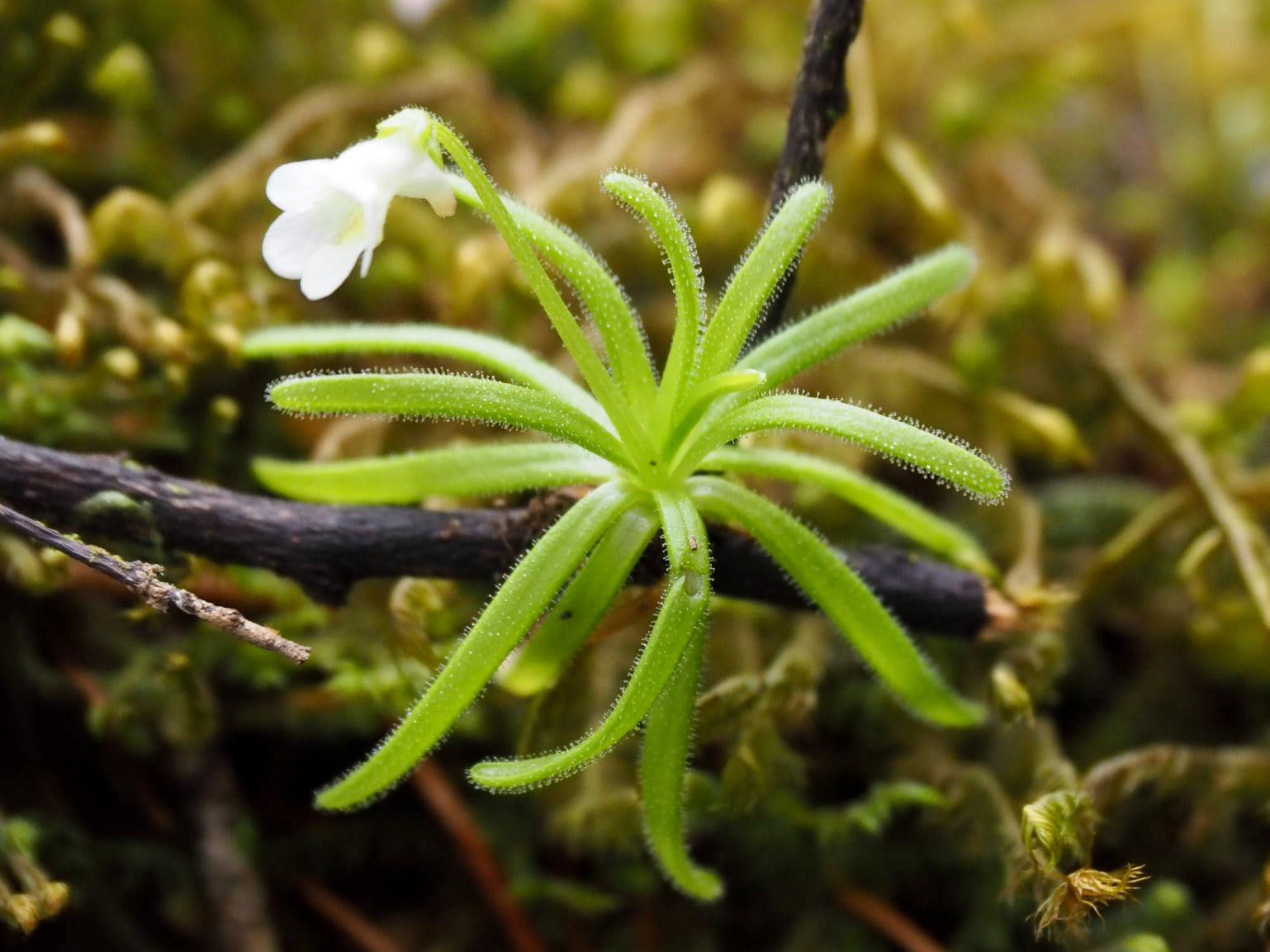

Scientific classification
- Kingdom: Plantae
- Clade: Tracheophytes
- Clade: Angiosperms
- Clade: Eudicots
- Clade: Asterids
- Order: Lamiales
- Family: Lentibulariaceae
- Genus: Pinguicula
- Species: P. casabitoana

Binomial name
- Pinguicula casabitoana J.Jiménez Alm.

Synonyms
- Pinguicula cladophila Ernst

= Pinguicula casabitoana =

Species of flowering plant

Pinguicula casabitoana, commonly known as the Casabito butterwort, is a critically endangered species of butterwort, endemic to the Dominican Republic. This species is mostly epiphytic and occurs in montane cloud forests. It is known from a few localities, all of them in the Cordillera Central.
