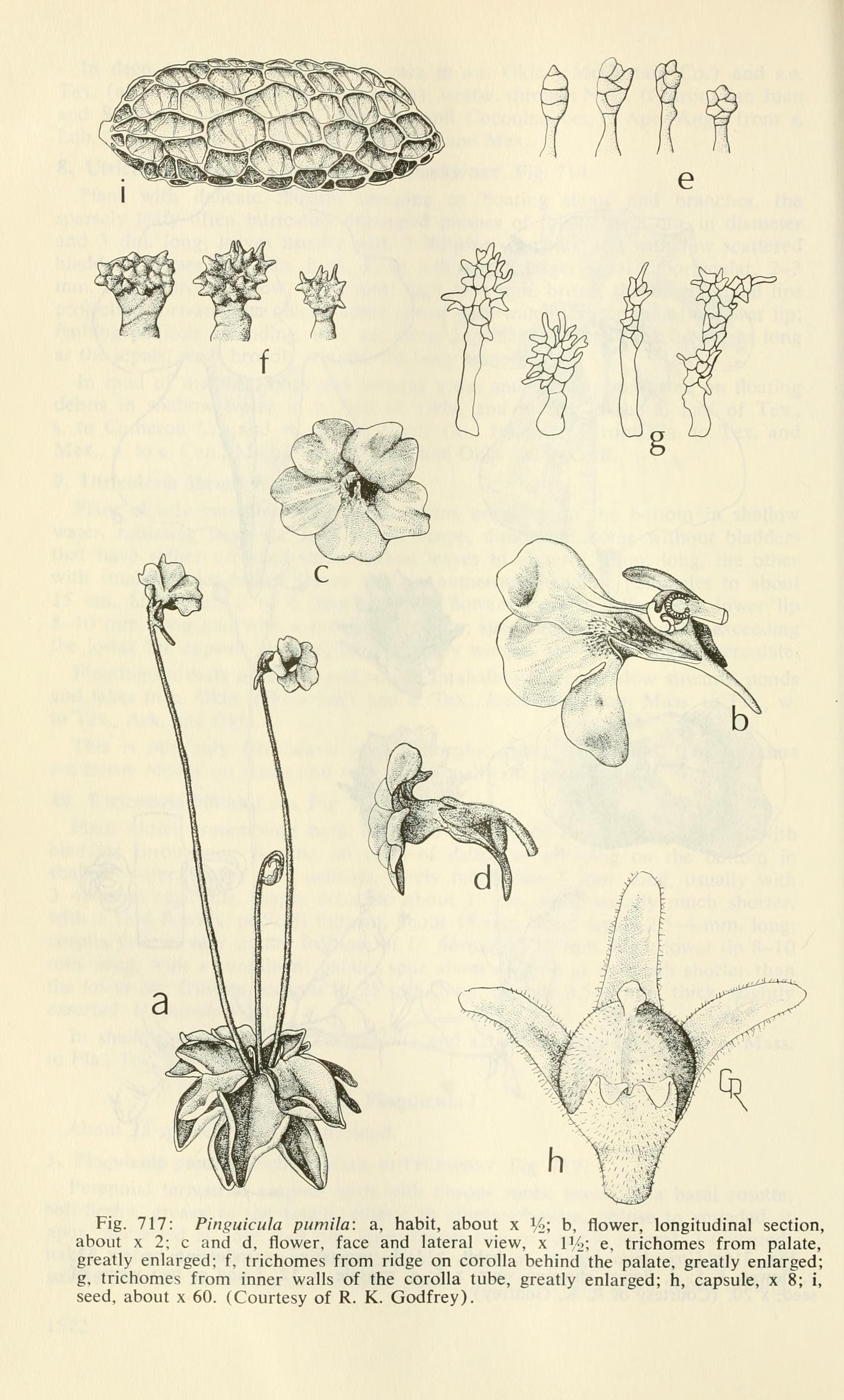

Scientific classification
- Kingdom: Plantae
- Clade: Tracheophytes
- Clade: Angiosperms
- Clade: Eudicots
- Clade: Asterids
- Order: Lamiales
- Family: Lentibulariaceae
- Genus: Pinguicula
- Species: P. pumila

Binomial name
- Pinguicula pumila Michx.

= Pinguicula pumila =

Species of plant

Pinguicula pumila, commonly known as the small butterwort or dwarf butterwort is a small species of carnivorous plant in the genus Pinguicula. It is native to the southeastern United States, where it grows in habitats where soil is poor in nutrition.

== Description ==
The plant grows as an annual small rosette of leaves, which rarely get larger than 3/4 of an inch (20 mm) across. The leaves have inward curling margins, and the upper surface is covered in numerous tiny hairs with glands at their tip which secrete small drops of mucilage. The plant produces single white to pale violet flowers on the ends of stalks about 6-8 inches (150–200 mm) high. Like all butterworts, the flowers are zygomorphic, and have a spur extending from the back of the flower.

== Carnivory ==
Insects can become trapped in the numerous sticky glads that cover the leaves, and the plant will secrete enzymes to digest them. Over time, the plant assimilates organic nitrogen and other nutrients from the decaying insect into its own tissues.

== Habitat ==
The plant can be found growing in moist, sandy soil in pinelands and savannas, from the southeastern US, into the great plains to Oklahoma.
