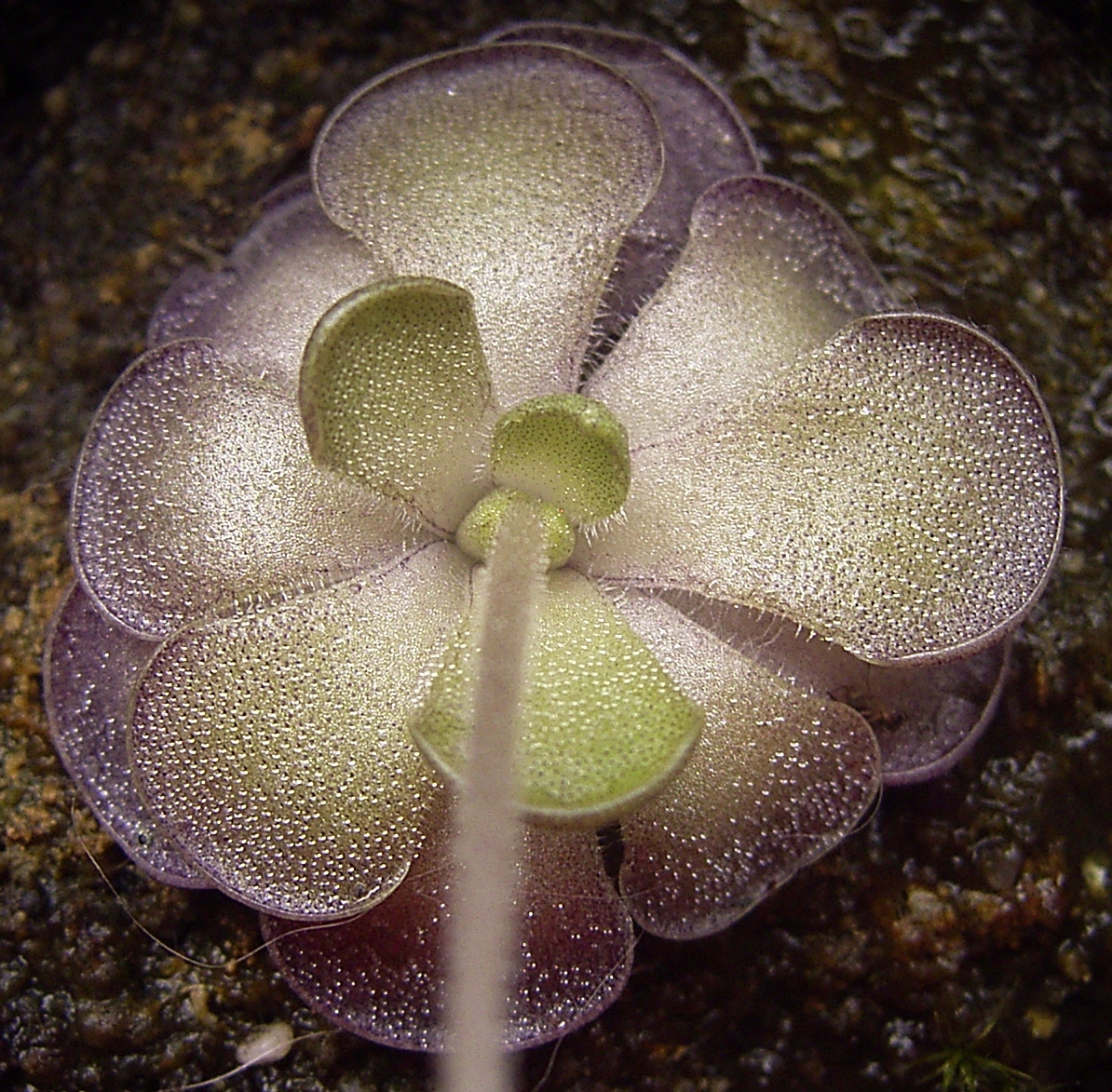
- Summer rosette of Pinguicula cyclosecta

Scientific classification
- Kingdom: Plantae
- Clade: Tracheophytes
- Clade: Angiosperms
- Clade: Eudicots
- Clade: Asterids
- Order: Lamiales
- Family: Lentibulariaceae
- Genus: Pinguicula
- Species: P. cyclosecta

Binomial name
- Pinguicula cyclosecta Casper

= Pinguicula cyclosecta =

Species of insectivorous plant from Mexico

Pinguicula cyclosecta is a perennial rosette-forming insectivorous plant native to the state of Nuevo León in Mexico.

== Description ==
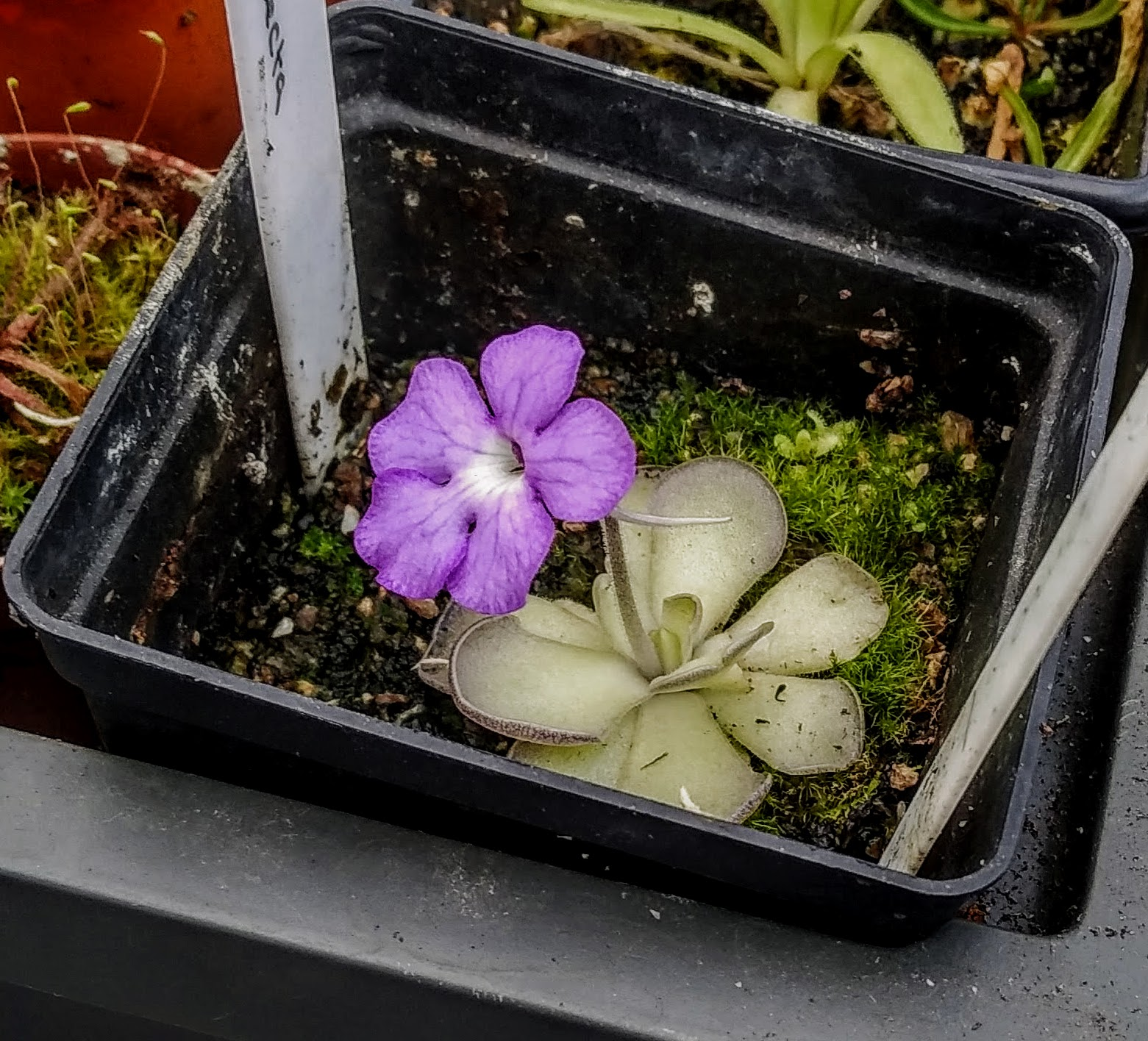
Flowering Pinguicula cyclosecta

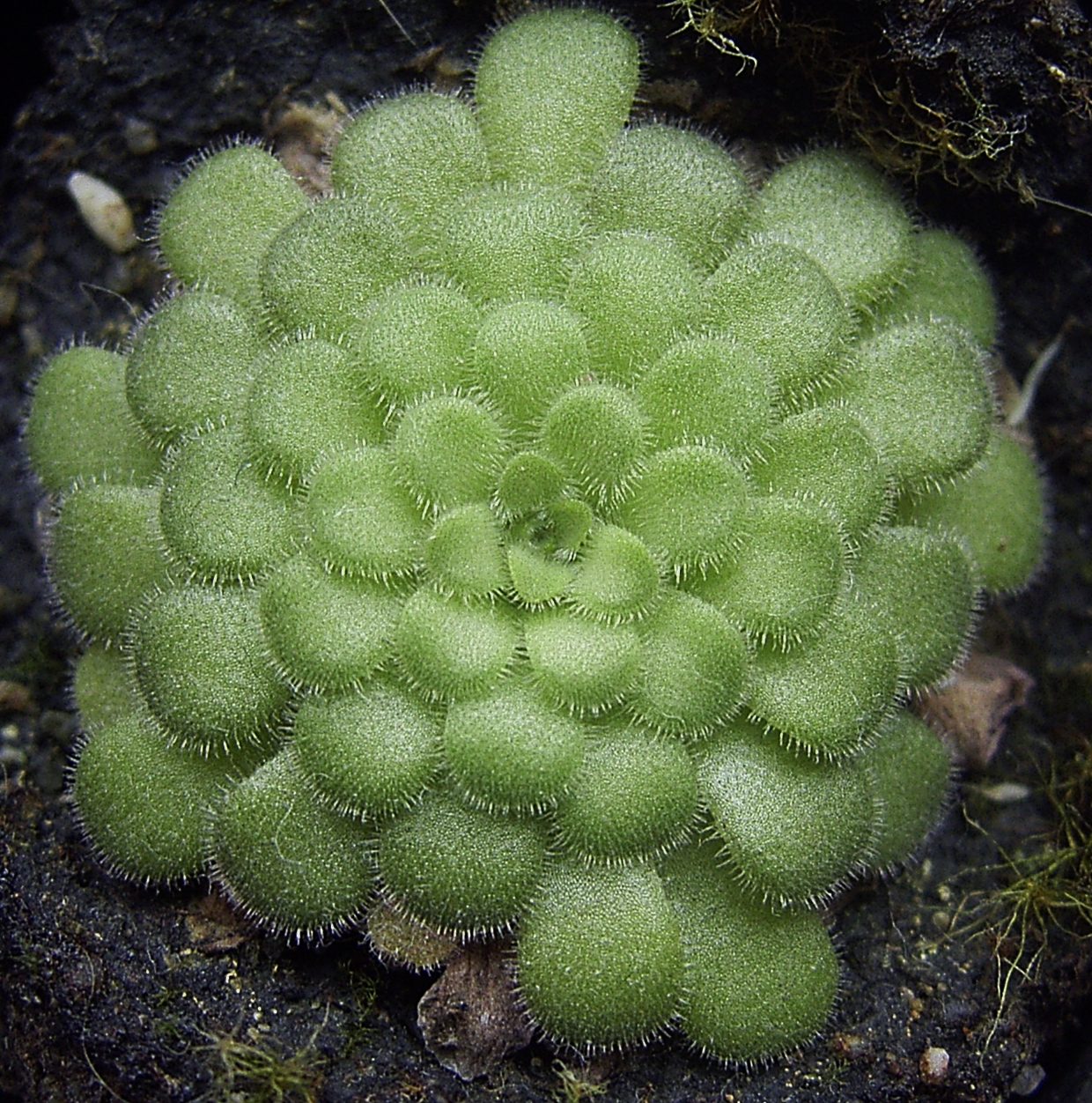
The succulent leaves of Pinguicula cyclosecta's winter rosette

The plants form small rosettes of leaves. During the summer months, the plant produces leaves that are covered in glandular hairs on their upper surface. These leaves are capable of catching, killing, and digesting small insect prey for the plant. The edges of the leaves may be tinged a bluish-purple, and in bright light, the entire leaf may be this color. During the winter months, the plant loses its carnivorous leaves and produces a rosette of reduced succulent leaves instead. Deep purple flowers are produced singly at the end of short scapes.
