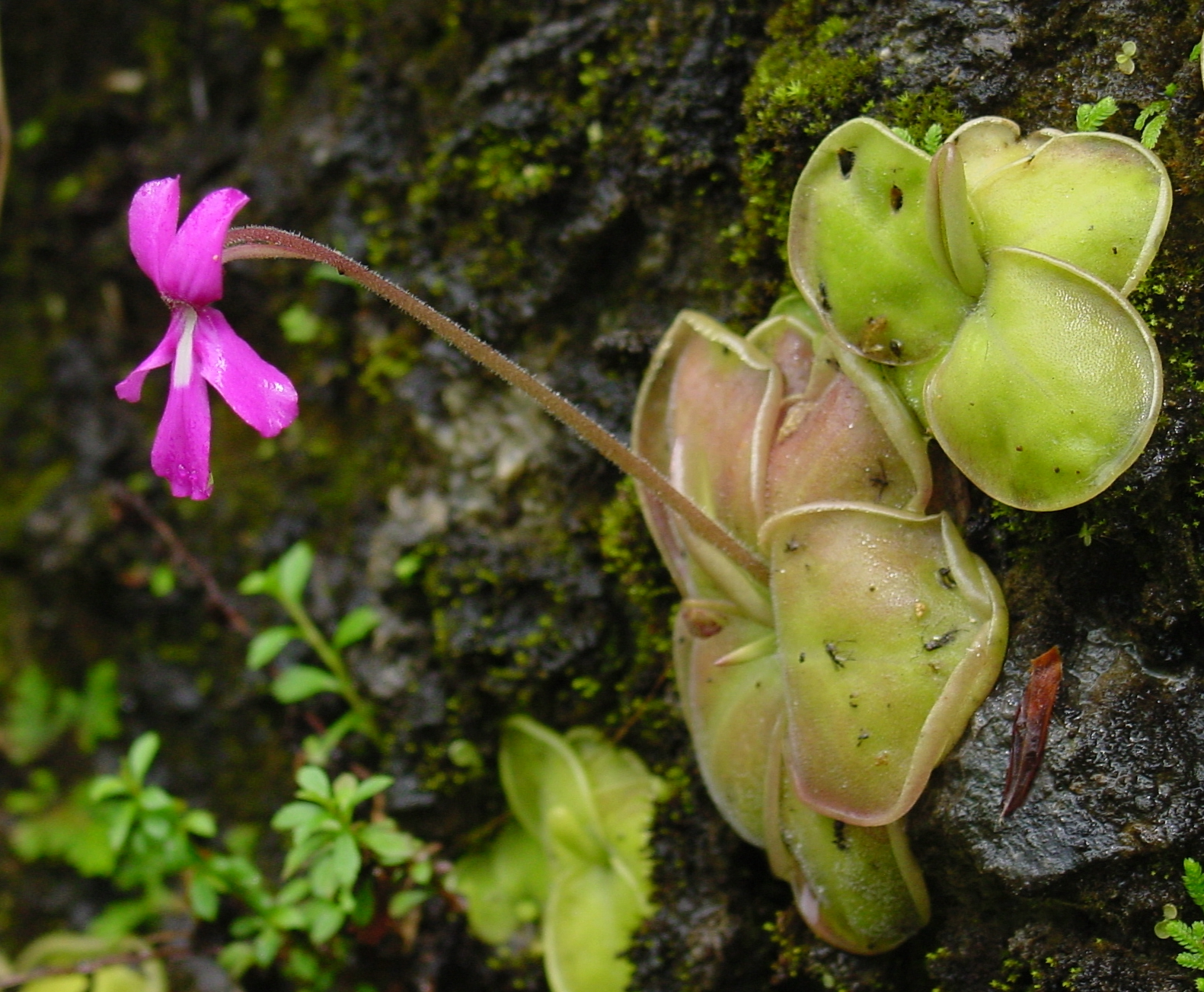
- Pinguicula moranensis

Scientific classification
- Kingdom: Plantae
- Clade: Tracheophytes
- Clade: Angiosperms
- Clade: Eudicots
- Clade: Asterids
- Order: Lamiales
- Family: Lentibulariaceae
- Genus: Pinguicula; L.

Species
- 126, see separate list.

Synonyms
- Brandonia Rchb.; Isoloba Raf.; Pinguicola Zumagl.

= Pinguicula =

Genus of flowering plants

Pinguicula, commonly known as butterworts, is a genus of carnivorous flowering plants in the family Lentibulariaceae. They use sticky, glandular leaves to lure, trap, and digest insects in order to supplement the poor mineral nutrition they obtain from the environment. 126 species are currently accepted. 13 are native to Europe, 9 to North America, and some to northern Asia. The largest number of species is in South and Central America.

== Etymology ==
The name Pinguicula is derived from a term coined by Conrad Gesner, who in his 1561 work entitled Horti Germaniae commented on the glistening leaves: "propter pinguia et tenera folia…" (Latin pinguis, "fat"). The common name "butterwort" reflects this characteristic.

== Characteristics ==
The majority of Pinguicula are perennial plants. The only known annuals are P. sharpii, P. takakii, P. crenatiloba, and P. pumila. All species form stemless rosettes.

=== Habitat ===
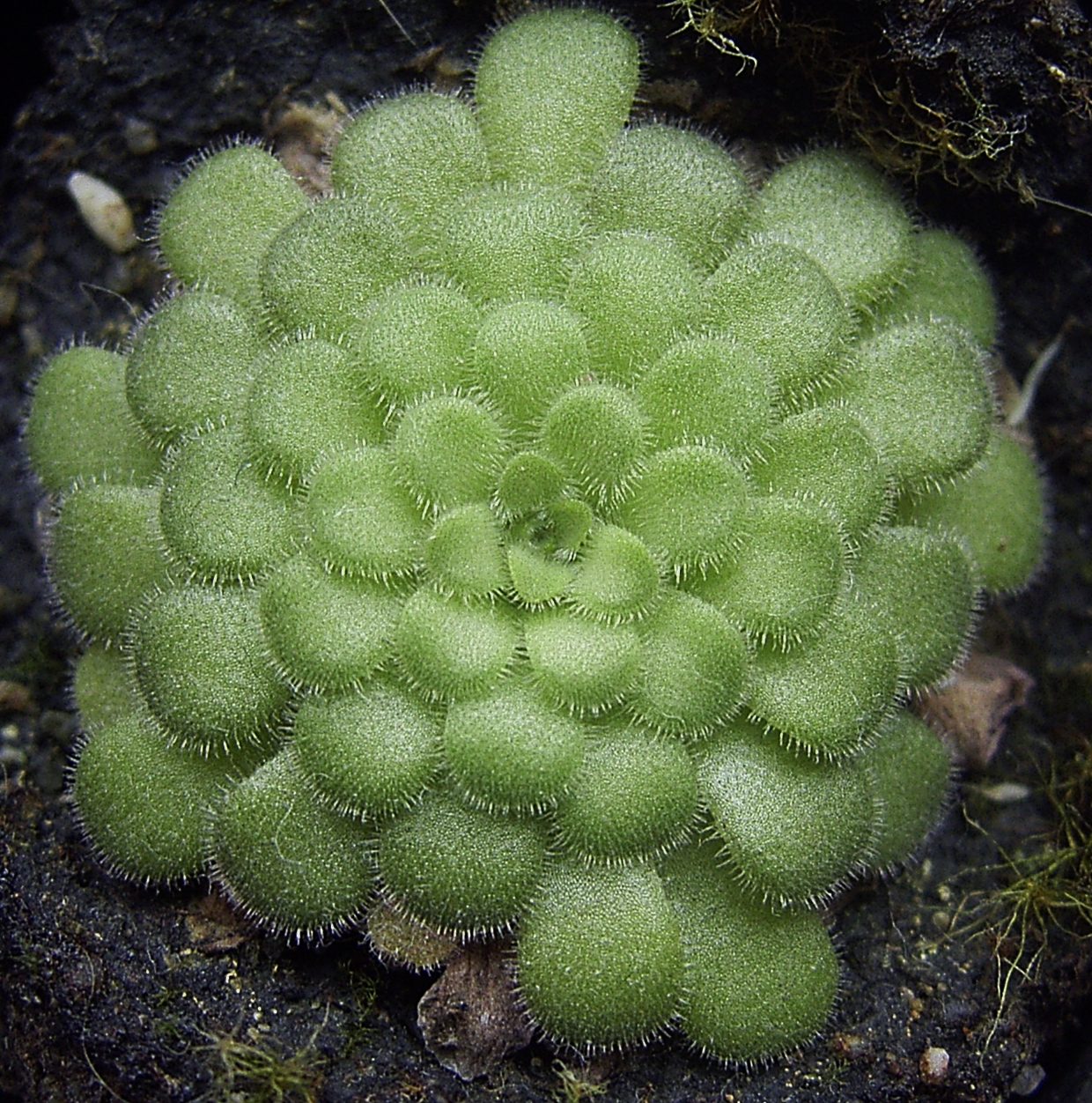
Winter rosette of Pinguicula cyclosecta (non-carnivorous phase)

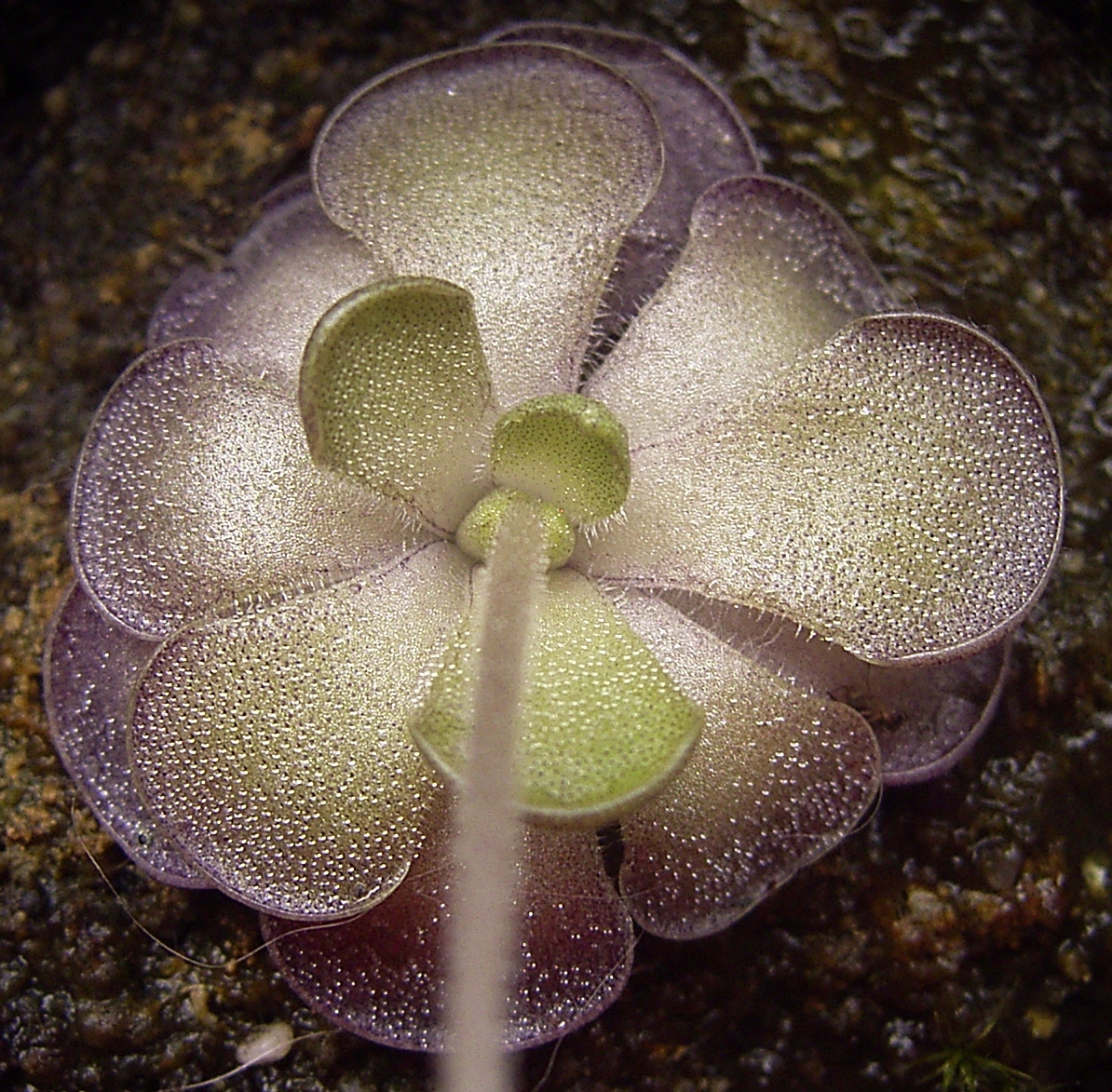
Summer rosette of Pinguicula cyclosecta (carnivorous phase)

Butterworts can be divided roughly into two main groups based on the climate in which they grow; each group is then further subdivided based on morphological characteristics. Although these groups are not cladistically supported by genetic studies, these groupings are nonetheless convenient for horticultural purposes.

Tropical butterworts form somewhat compact winter rosettes composed of fleshy leaves or retain carnivorous leaves year-round. They are typically located in regions where water is least seasonally plentiful, as too damp soil conditions can lead to rotting. They are found in areas in which nitrogenous resources are known to be in low levels, infrequent or unavailable, due to acidic soil conditions.

Temperate species often form tight buds (called hibernacula) composed of scale-like leaves during a winter dormancy period. During this time the roots (with the exception of P. alpina) and carnivorous leaves wither. Temperate species flower when they form their summer rosettes while tropical species flower at each rosette change.

Many butterworts cycle between rosettes composed of carnivorous and non-carnivorous leaves as the seasons change, so these two ecological groupings can be further divided according to their ability to produce different leaves during their growing season. If the growth in the summer is different in size or shape to that in the early spring (for temperate species) or in the winter (tropical species), then plants are considered heterophyllous; whereas uniform growth identifies a homophyllous species.

This results in four groupings:

- Tropical butterworts: species which do not undergo a winter dormancy but continue to alternately bloom and form rosettes.
  - Heterophyllous tropical species: species that alternate between rosettes of carnivorous leaves during the warm season and compact rosettes of fleshy non-carnivorous leaves during the cool season. Examples include P. moranensis, P. gypsicola, and P. laxifolia.
  - Homophyllous tropical species: these species produce rosettes of carnivorous leaves of roughly uniform size throughout the year, such as P. gigantea.
- Temperate butterworts: these plants are native to climate zones with cold winters. They produce a winter-resting bud (hibernaculum) during the winter.
  - Heterophyllous temperate species: species where the vegetative and generative rosettes differ in shape and/or size, as seen in P. lutea and P. lusitanica.
  - Homophyllous temperate species: the vegetative and generative rosettes appear identical, as exhibited by P. alpina, P. grandiflora, and P. vulgaris.

=== Roots ===
The root system of Pinguicula species is relatively undeveloped. The thin, white roots serve mainly as an anchor for the plant and to absorb moisture (nutrients are absorbed through carnivory). In temperate species these roots wither (except in P. alpina) when the hibernaculum is formed. In the few epiphytic species (such as P. lignicola), the roots form anchoring suction cups.

=== Leaves and carnivory ===
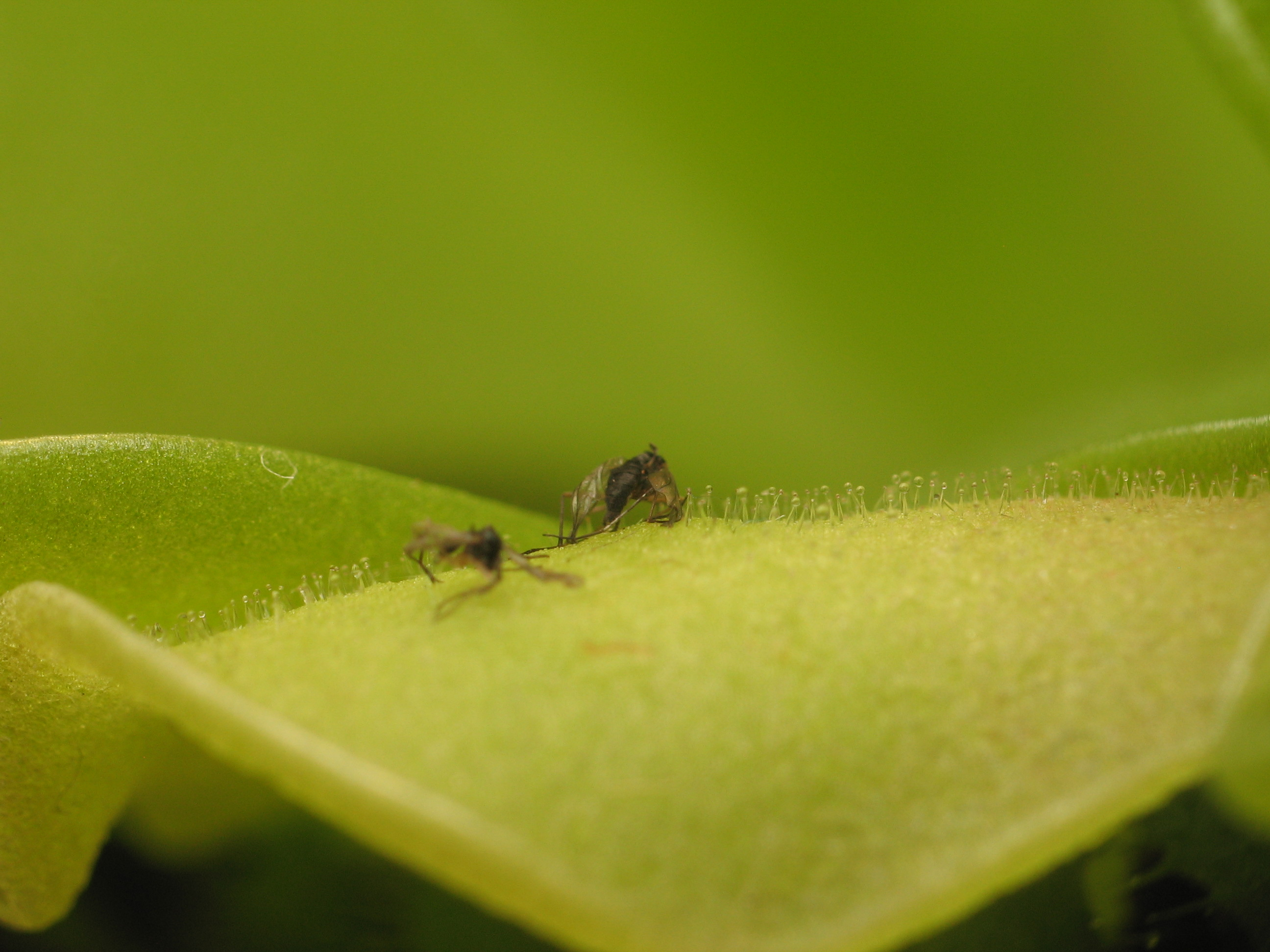
A fly trapped on a butterwort leaf. Glandular hairs are visible.

The leaf blade of a butterwort is smooth, rigid, and succulent, usually bright green or pinkish in colour. Depending on species, the leaves are between 2 and 30 cm (1–12") long. The leaf shape depends on the species, but is usually roughly obovate, spatulate, or linear. They can also appear yellow in colour with a soft feel and a greasy consistency to the leaves.

Vector graphic of the trapping and digestive features of a Pinguicula leaf

Like all members of the family Lentibulariaceae, butterworts are carnivorous. The mechanistic actions that these plants use to lure and capture prey is through a means of sticky or adhesive substances (mucilage) that are secreted by glands located on the leaf's surface. In order to catch and digest insects, the leaf of a butterwort uses two specialized glands which are scattered across the leaf surface (usually only on the upper surface, with the exception of P. gigantea and P. longifolia ssp. longifolia).

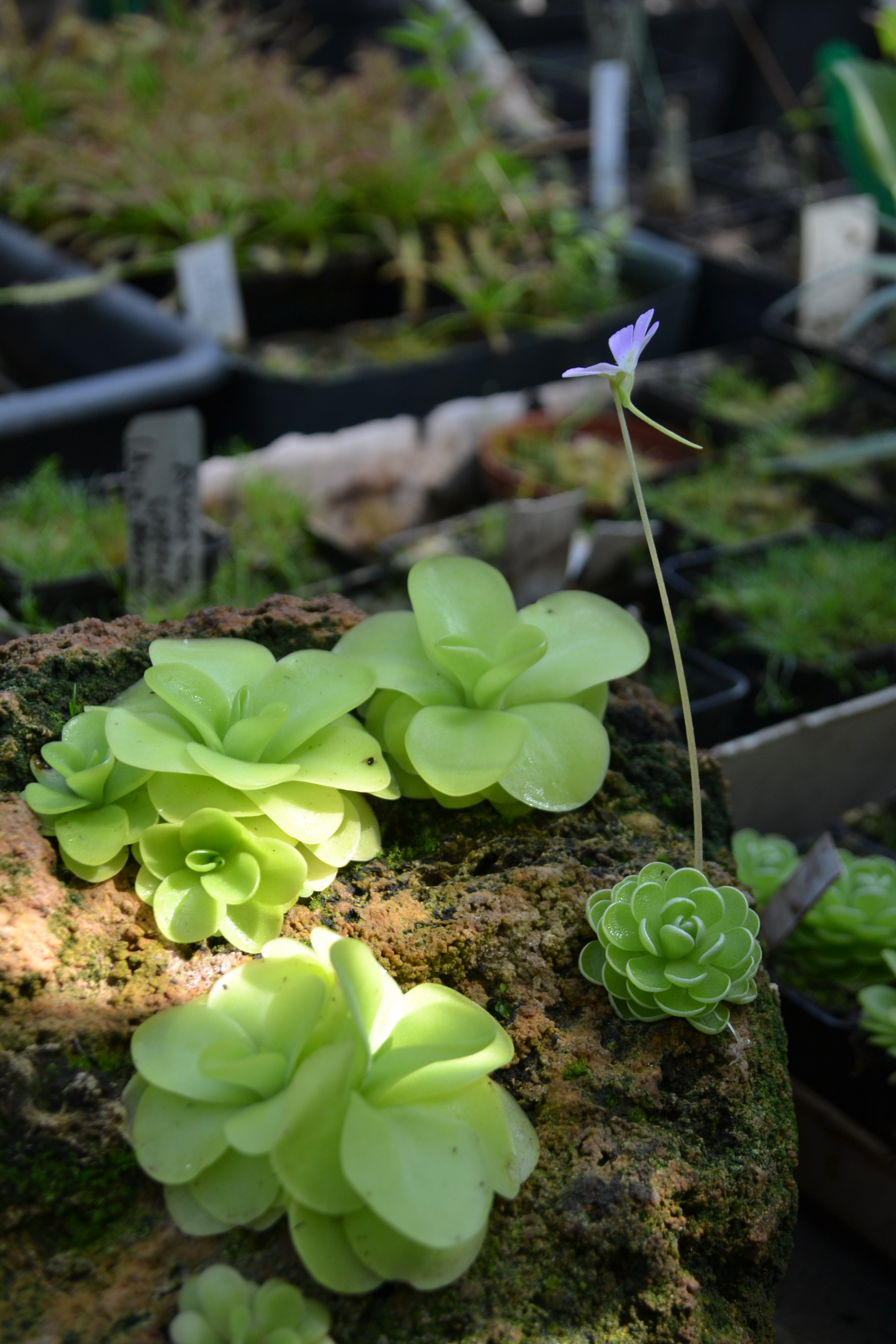
Pinguicula esseriana in the greenhouse of the Kharkiv Botanical Garden

One is termed a peduncular gland, and consists of a few secretory cells on top of a single stalk cell. These cells produce a mucilaginous secretion which forms visible droplets across the leaf surface. This wet appearance probably helps lure prey in search of water (a similar phenomenon is observed in the sundews). The droplets contain limited amounts of digestive enzymes, and serve mainly to entrap insects. On contact with an insect, the peduncular glands release additional mucilage from special reservoir cells located at the base of their stalks. The insect will begin to struggle, triggering more glands and encasing itself in mucilage. Some species can bend their leaf edges slightly by thigmotropism, bringing additional glands into contact with the trapped insect.

The second type of gland found on butterwort leaves are sessile glands which lie flat on the leaf surface. Once the prey is entrapped by the peduncular glands and digestion begins, the initial flow of nitrogen triggers enzyme release by the sessile glands. These enzymes, which include amylase, esterase, phosphatase, protease, and ribonuclease break down the digestible components of the insect body. These fluids are then absorbed back into the leaf surface through cuticular holes, leaving only the chitin exoskeleton of the larger insects on the leaf surface.

The holes in the cuticle which allow for this digestive mechanism also pose a challenge for the plant, since they serve as breaks in the cuticle (waxy layer) that protects the plant from desiccation. As a result, most butterworts live in humid environments.

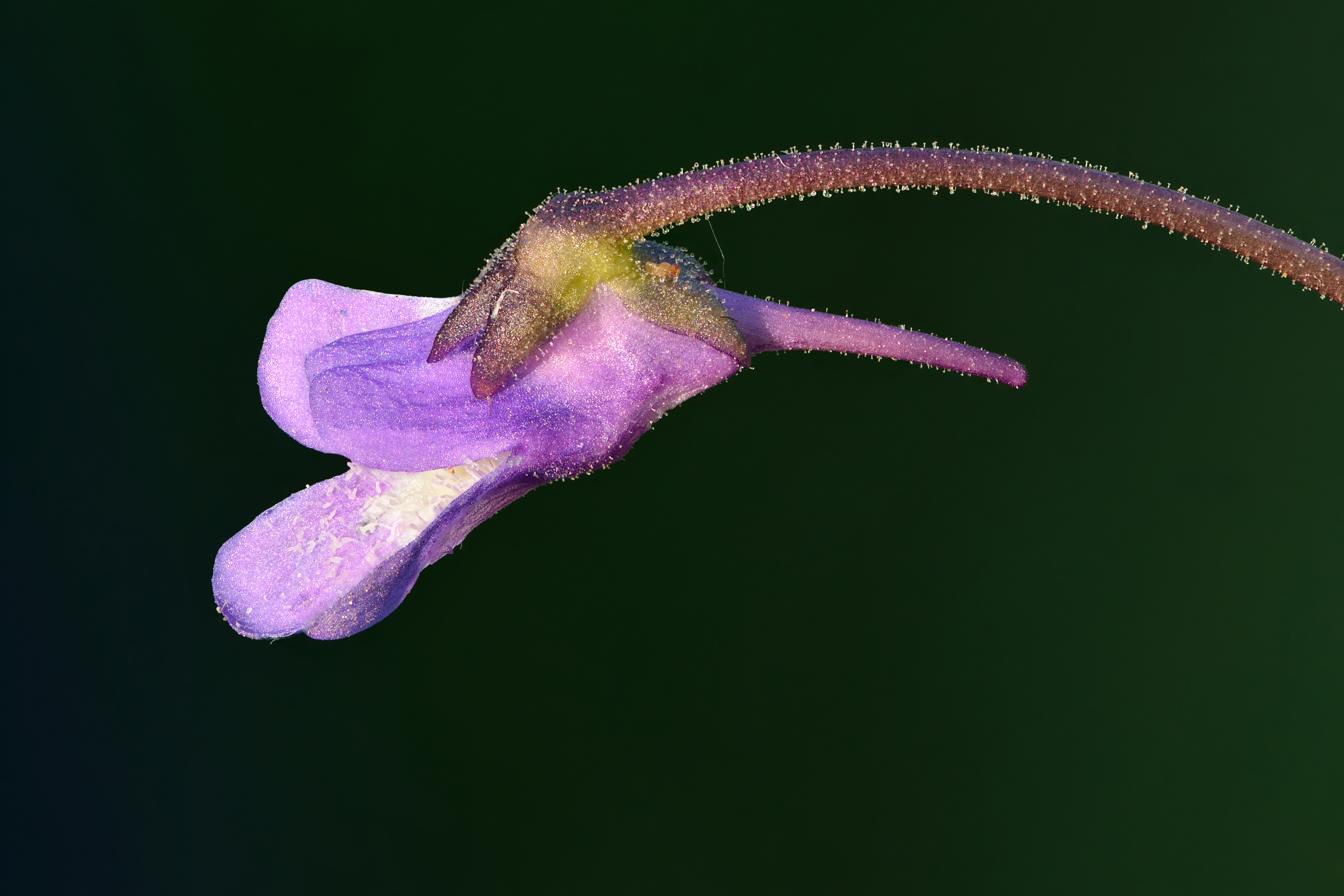
Flower of P. vulgaris

Butterworts are usually only able to trap small insects and those with large wing surfaces. They can also digest pollen which lands on their leaf surface. The secretory system can only function a single time, so that a particular area of the leaf surface can only be used to digest insects once.

Unlike many other carnivorous plant species, butterworts do not appear to use jasmonates as a control system to switch on the production of digestive enzymes. Jasmonates are involved in the butterwort's defense against attacking insects, but not in its response to prey. Of the eight enzymes identified in the digestive secretions of butterworts, alpha-amylase appears to be unique when compared to other carnivorous plants. This research suggests that butterwort may have co-opted a different set of genes in its development of carnivory.

=== Flowers ===
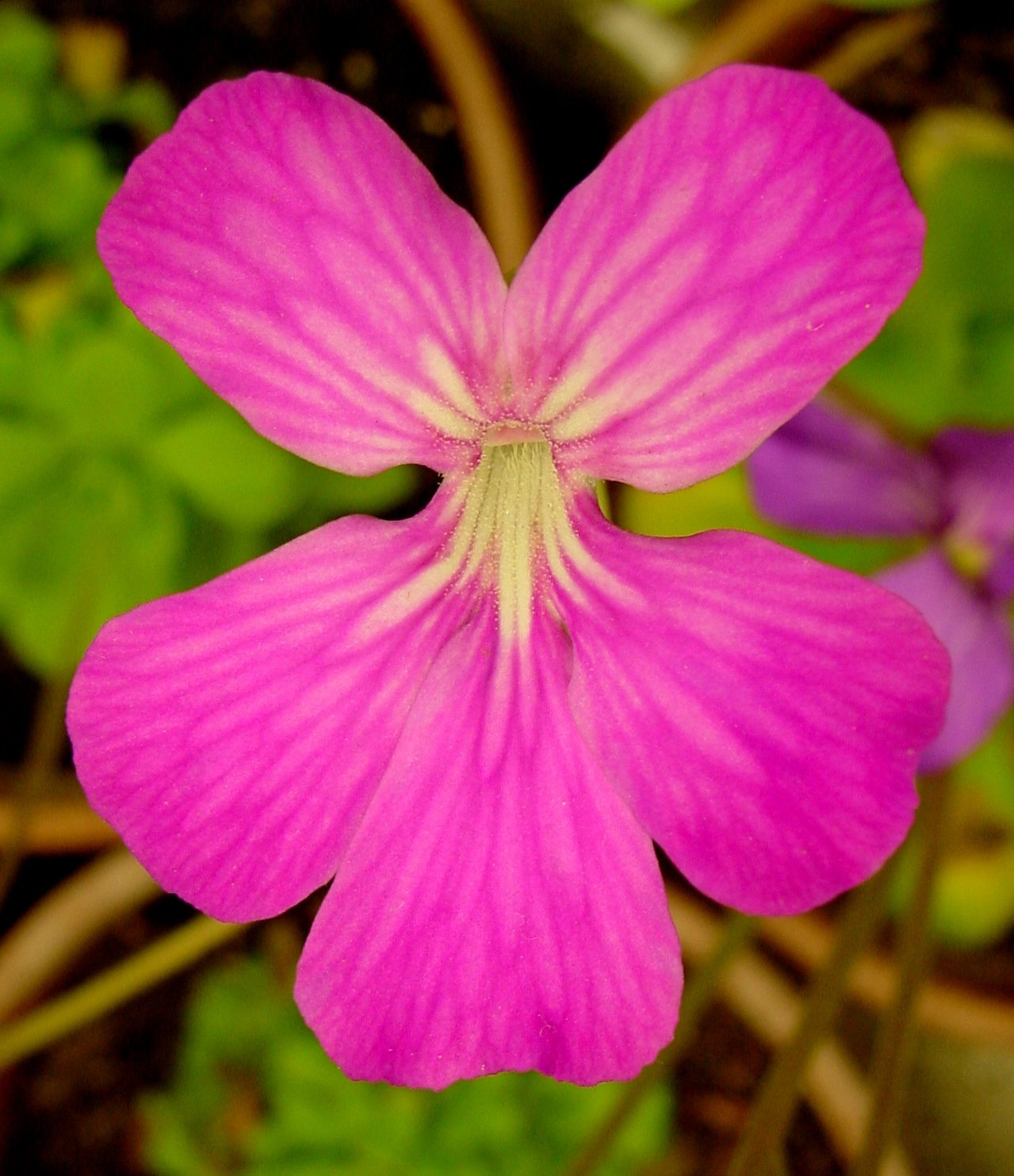
The flower of a hybrid butterwort

As with almost all carnivorous plants, the flowers of butterworts are held far above the rest of the plant by a long stalk, in order to reduce the probability of trapping potential pollinators. The single, long-lasting flowers are zygomorphic, with two lower lip petals characteristic of the bladderwort family, and a spur extending from the back of the flower. The calyx has five sepals, and the petals are arranged in a two-part lower lip and a three-part upper lip. Most butterwort flowers are blue, violet or white, often suffused with a yellow, greenish or reddish tint. P. laueana and the newly described P. caryophyllacea are unique in having strikingly red flowers. Butterworts are often cultivated and hybridized primarily for their flowers.

The shape and colors of butterwort flowers are distinguishing characteristics which are used to divide the genus into subgenera and to distinguish individual species from one another.

=== Fruit and seed ===
The round to egg-shaped seed capsules open when dry into two halves, exposing numerous small (0.5–1 mm), brown seeds. If moisture is present the silique closes, protecting the seed and opening again upon dryness to allow for wind dispersal. Many species have a net-like pattern on their seed surface to allow them to land on water surfaces without sinking, since many non-epiphytic butterworts grow near water sources. The haploid chromosome number of butterworts is either n = 8 or n = 11 (or a multiple thereof), depending on species. The exception is P. lusitanica, whose chromosome count is n = 6.

=== Diet ===
The diet will range depending on the taxonomy and size of the prey due to the plant's retention ability. These size limitations are known to be the main element influencing what prey sources this carnivorous plant can access. They can also acquire nourishment from pollen and other plant parts that are high in protein, as other plants can become trapped on their leaves, thus, butterworts are both carnivorous and herbivorous plants. The diet consists of several species from the arthropod taxa; the majority of their prey are insects that have wings and are able to fly. The luring, retaining, and seizing of prey are the first steps in the feeding procedure for carnivorous plants; the result of the process is absorption and digestion of nutrients sourced from these food supplies. Pinguicula species do not select their prey, as they passively accumulate them through methods of sticky, adhesive leaves. However, they do have the ability of visual attraction via their colorful leaves, which will increase the likelihood of luring and capturing a specific taxa. Pinguicula capture their food source/ prey by means of the mucilaginous, sticky substances produced by their stalk glands on the top of their leaf. Once the prey has become trapped in the peduncular glands, the sessile glands present will then produce enzymes needed to accomplish digestion and breaking down the digestible regions of the prey for their nutrients; taking in the fluids of the food source by means of cuticular holes present on the leaf's surface.

=== Vegetative propagation ===
As well as sexual reproduction by seed, many butterworts can reproduce asexually by vegetative reproduction. Many members of the genus form offshoots during or shortly after flowering (e.g., P. vulgaris), which grow into new genetically identical adults. A few other species form new offshoots using stolons (e.g., P. calyptrata, P. vallisneriifolia) while others form plantlets at the leaf margins (e.g., P. heterophylla, P. primuliflora).

== Distribution ==
Pinguicula distribution

Butterworts are distributed throughout the Northern Hemisphere (map). The greatest concentration of species, however, is in humid mountainous regions of Mexico, Central America and South America, where populations can be found as far south as Tierra del Fuego. Australia and Antarctica are the only continents without any native butterworts.

While the highest diversity of species is observed in Central America (roughly 50% of butterwort species are found here), the most ancestral species of the genus Pinguicula, both in terms of morphology and molecular reconstruction, are the group of temperate homophyllous species (examples include P. lusitanica, P. hirtiflora, P. antarctica, P. lutea, etc.). Likewise, as other members of Lentibulariaceae family, Pinguicula ancestors evolved in South America, where Andean species most probably present as remnants of the ancestral stock of South American Pinguicula adapted to highland conditions with the rise of the Andes

The great majority of individual Pinguicula species have a very limited distribution, often restricted to few canyons or mountain cliffs. The two butterwort species with the widest distribution - P. alpina and P. vulgaris - are found throughout much of Europe and North America and in some regions in Asia. Other species found in North America include P. caerulea, P. ionantha, P. lutea, P. macroceras, P. planifolia, P. primuliflora, P. pumila, and P. villosa.

== Habitat ==
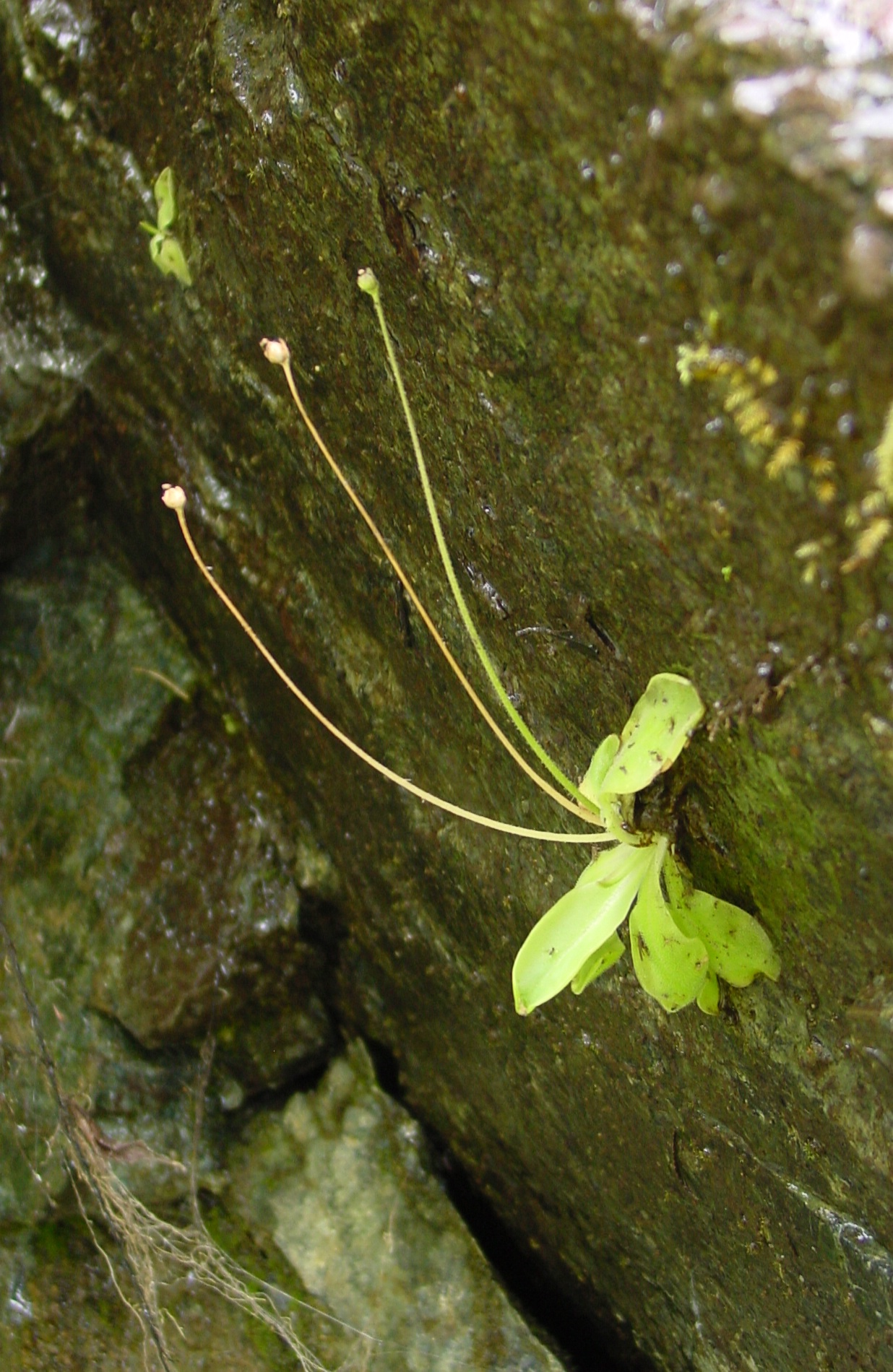
P. macroceras ssp. nortensis growing on a wet rock wall in northern California.

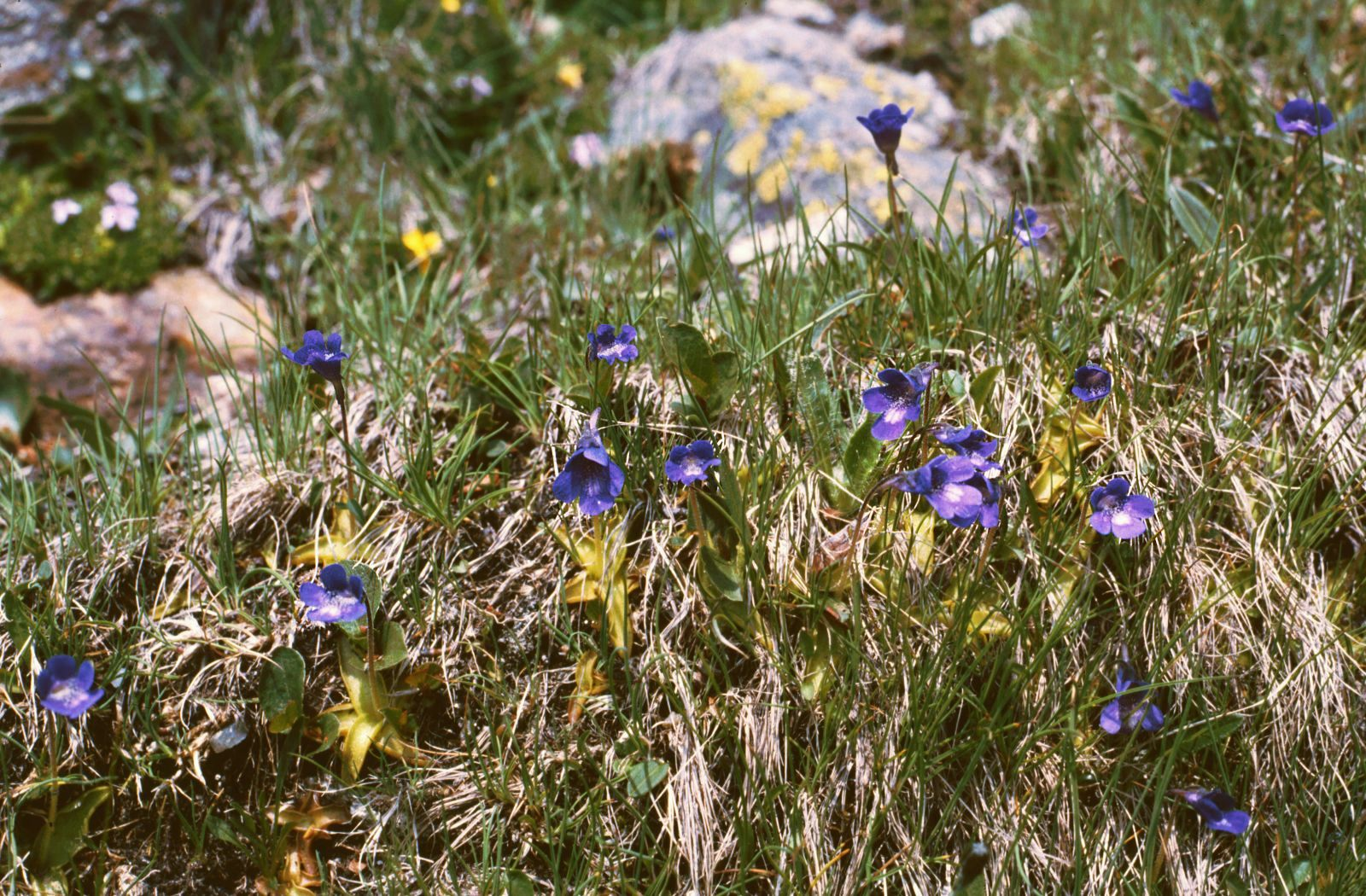
P. leptoceras in alpine grassland in Südtirol, Italy

In general, butterworts grow in nutrient-poor, alkaline soils. Some species have adapted to other soil types, such as acidic peat bogs (ex. P. vulgaris, P. calyptrata, P. lusitanica), soils composed of pure gypsum (P. gypsicola and other Mexican species), or even vertical rock walls (P. ramosa, P. vallisneriifolia, and most of the Mexican species). A few species are epiphytes (P. casabitoana, P. hemiepiphytica, P. lignicola). Many of the Mexican species commonly grow on mossy banks, rock, and roadsides in oak-pine forests. Pinguicula macroceras ssp. nortensis has even been observed growing on hanging dead grasses. P. lutea grows in pine flatwoods. Other species, such as P. vulgaris, grow in fens. Secondary habitats, such as anthropogenic biomes, might include steep rock walls along the roads or roadside ditches. Each of these environments is nutrient-poor, allowing butterworts to escape competition from other canopy-forming species, particularly grasses and sedges.

Butterworts need habitats that are almost constantly moist or wet, at least during their carnivorous growth stage. Many Mexican species lose their carnivorous leaves, and sprout succulent leaves, or die back to onion-like "bulbs" to survive the winter drought, at which point they can survive in bone-dry conditions. The moisture they need for growing can be supplied by either a high groundwater table, or by high humidity or high precipitation. Unlike many other carnivorous plants that require sunny locations, many butterworts thrive in part-sun or even shady conditions.

== Conservation status ==
The environmental threats faced by various Pinguicula species depend on their location and on how widespread their distribution is. Most endangered are the species which are endemic to small areas, such as P. ramosa, P. casabitoana, and P. fiorii. These populations are threatened primarily by habitat destruction. Wetland destruction has threatened several US species. Most of these are federally listed as either threatened or endangered; P. ionantha was listed as threatened in 1993 through the U.S. Endangered Species Act, and in 2022, The United States Fish & Wildlife Service initiated a five-year status review.

== Botanical history ==
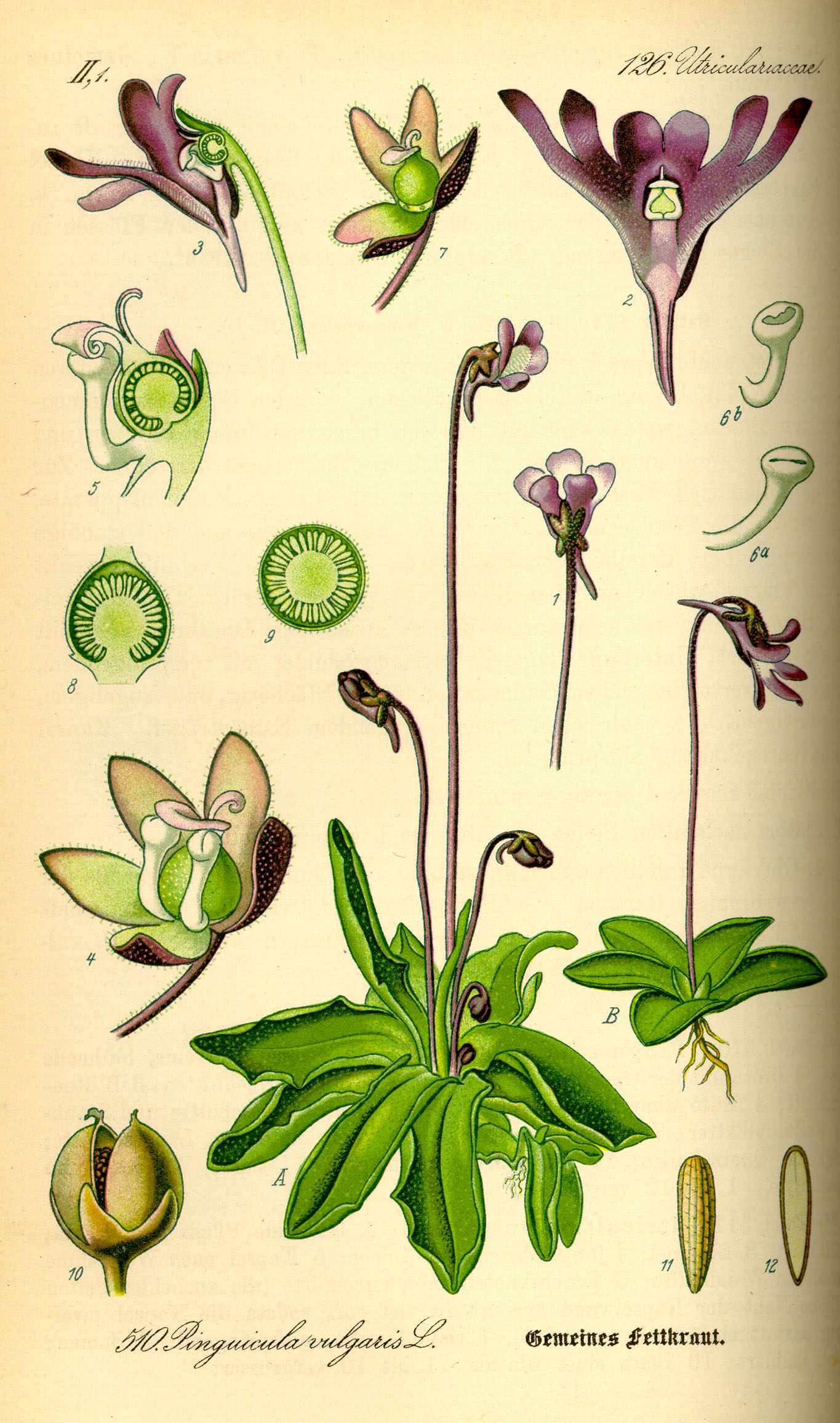
Pinguicula vulgaris, illustration

The first mention of butterworts in botanical literature is an entry entitled Zitroch chrawt oder schmalz chrawt ("lard herb") by Vitus Auslasser in his 1479 work on medicinal herbs entitled Macer de viribus Herbarum. The name Zittrochkraut is still used for butterworts in Tirol, Austria.

In 1583, Clusius already distinguished between two forms in his Historia stirpium rariorum per Pannoniam, Austriam: a blue-flowered form (P. vulgaris) and a white-flowered form (Pinguicula alpina). Linnaeus added P. villosa and P. lusitanica when he published his Species Plantarum in 1753. The number of known species rose sharply with the exploration of the new continents in the 19th century; by 1844, 32 species were known.

It was only in the late 19th century that the carnivory of this genus began to be studied in detail. In a letter to Asa Gray dated June 3, 1874, Charles Darwin mentioned his early observations of the butterwort's digestive process and insectivorous nature. Darwin studied these plants extensively. S. J. Casper's large 1966 monograph of the genus included 46 species, a number which has almost doubled since then. Many exciting discoveries have been made in recent years, especially in Mexico. Another important development in the history of butterworts is the formation of the International Pinguicula Study Group, an organization dedicated to furthering the knowledge of this genus and promoting its popularity in cultivation, in the 1990s.

== Uses ==
Butterworts are widely cultivated by carnivorous plant enthusiasts. The temperate species and many of the Mexican butterworts are relatively easy to grow and have therefore gained relative popularity. Two of the most widely grown plants are the hybrid cultivars Pinguicula × 'Sethos' and Pinguicula × 'Weser'. Both are crosses of Pinguicula ehlersiae and Pinguicula moranensis, and are employed by commercial orchid nurseries to combat pests.

Butterworts also produce a strong bactericide which prevents insects from rotting while they are being digested. According to Linnaeus, this property has long been known by northern Europeans, who applied butterwort leaves to the sores of cattle to promote healing. Additionally, butterwort leaves were used to curdle milk and form a buttermilk-like fermented milk product called filmjölk (Sweden) and tjukkmjølk (Norway).

== Classification ==
Pinguicula belong to the bladderwort family (Lentibulariaceae), along with Utricularia and Genlisea. Siegfried Jost Casper systematically divided them into three subgenera with 15 sections.

A detailed study of the phylogenetics of butterworts by Cieslak et al. (2005) found that all of the currently accepted subgenera and many of the sections were polyphyletic. The diagram below gives a more accurate representation of the correct cladogram. Polyphyletic sections are marked with an *.

                  ┌────Clade I (Sections Temnoceras *, Orcheosanthus *, Longitubus,
                  │             Heterophyllum *, Agnata *, Isoloba *, Crassifolia)
                  │
              ┌───┤
              │   │
              │   │
       ┌──────┤   └────Clade II (Section Micranthus * = P. alpina)
       │      │
       │      │
   ┌───┤      └────────Clade III (Sections Micranthus *, Nana)
   │   │
   │   │
───┤   └───────────────Clade IV (Section Pinguicula)
   │
   │
   └───────────────────Clade V (Sections Isoloba *, Ampullipalatum, Cardiophyllum)
