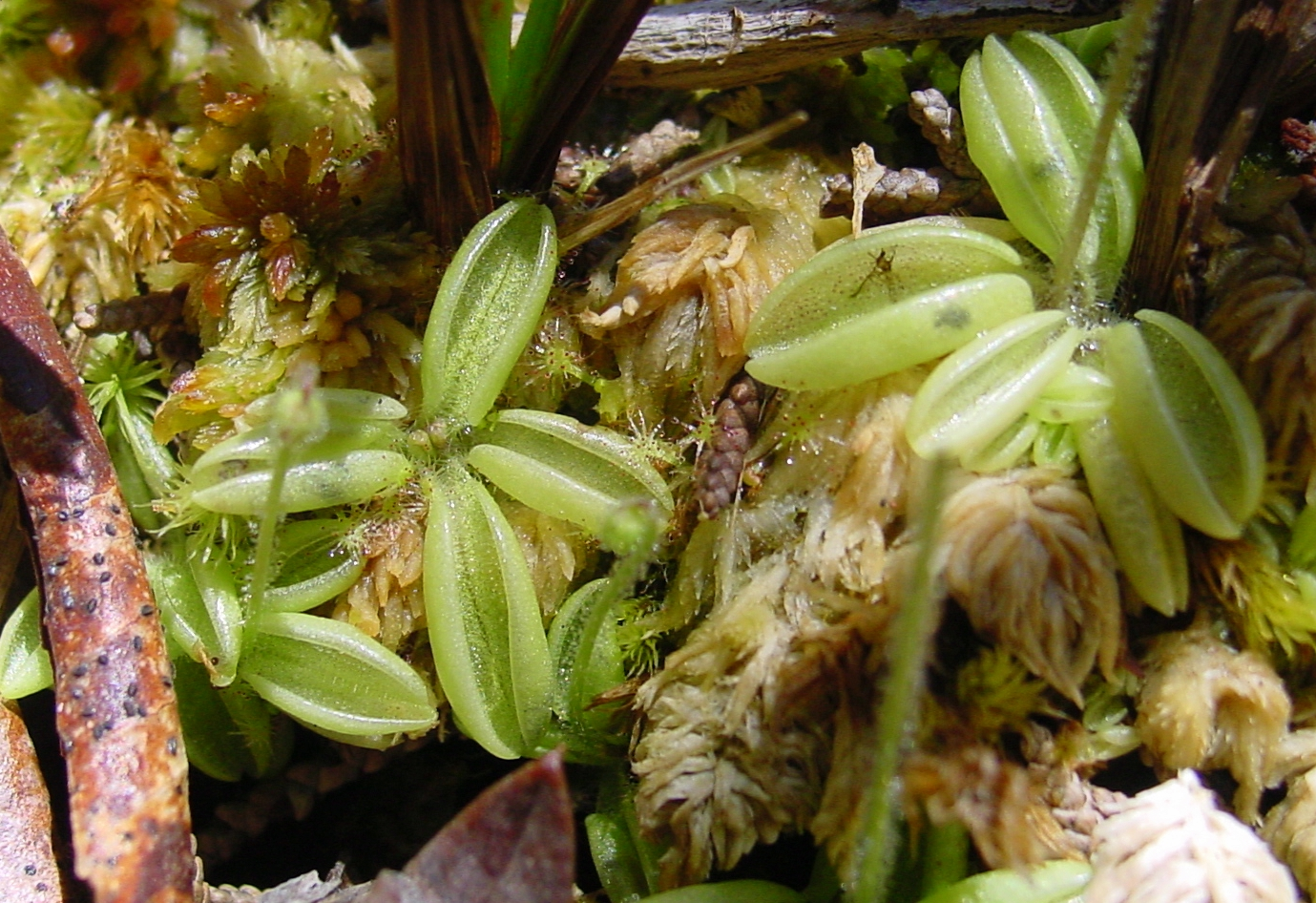

Conservation status
- Least Concern (IUCN 3.1)

Scientific classification
- Kingdom: Plantae
- Clade: Tracheophytes
- Clade: Angiosperms
- Clade: Eudicots
- Clade: Asterids
- Order: Lamiales
- Family: Lentibulariaceae
- Genus: Pinguicula
- Species: P. lusitanica

Binomial name
- Pinguicula lusitanica L.

= Pinguicula lusitanica =

Species of carnivorous plant

Pinguicula lusitanica, commonly known as the pale butterwort, is a small butterwort that grows wild in acidic peat bog areas along coastal Atlantic western Europe from western Scotland and Ireland south through western England and western France to the Iberian Peninsula and Morocco in north-western Africa.

== Description ==
P. lusitanica usually forms rosettes 3–5 centimetres (1.2–2.0 in) across. It is a perennial plant that sometimes acts as an annual plant as it may die after one growth season. It flowers just months after germinating and produces copious amounts of seed, making it somewhat of a weed for carnivorous plant growers. The flowers are small, pale pink with a yellow centre, and funnel-shaped. It self-pollinates to ensure that it will grow back the following year.

== Cultivation ==
Pinguicula lusitanica grows easily in most environments as long as it is not directly exposed to the sun and is kept wet with rainwater. It will feed on any small insects including gnats, fruit flies, ants, small moths, and small mosquitos. Pinguicula lusitanica is considered an easy grower by many carnivorous plant growers and is a good candidate as a beginner carnivorous plant.
