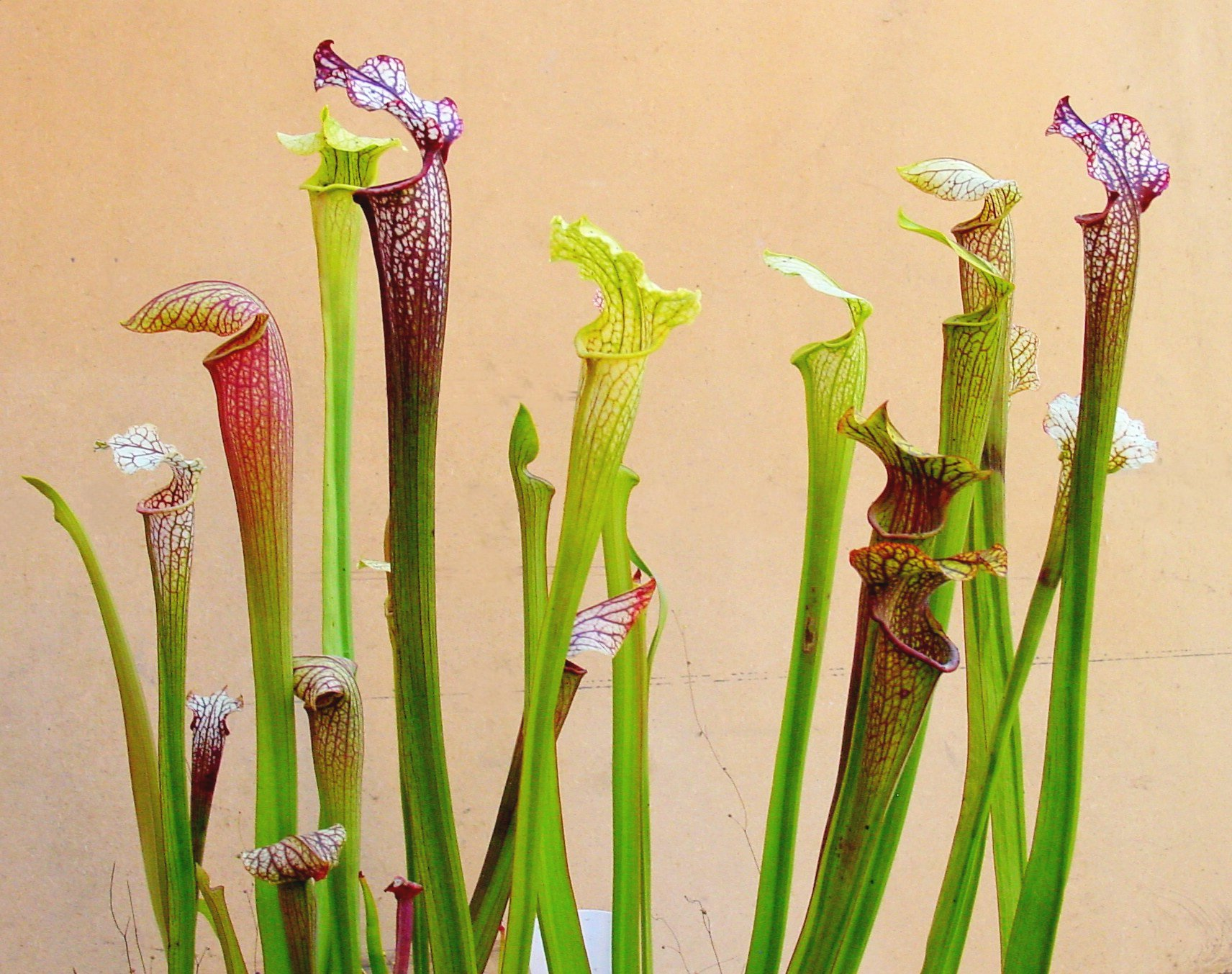
- Sarracenia species and hybrids

Scientific classification
- Kingdom: Plantae
- Clade: Tracheophytes
- Clade: Angiosperms
- Clade: Eudicots
- Clade: Asterids
- Order: Ericales
- Family: Sarraceniaceae
- Genus: Sarracenia; L.

Species
- See text
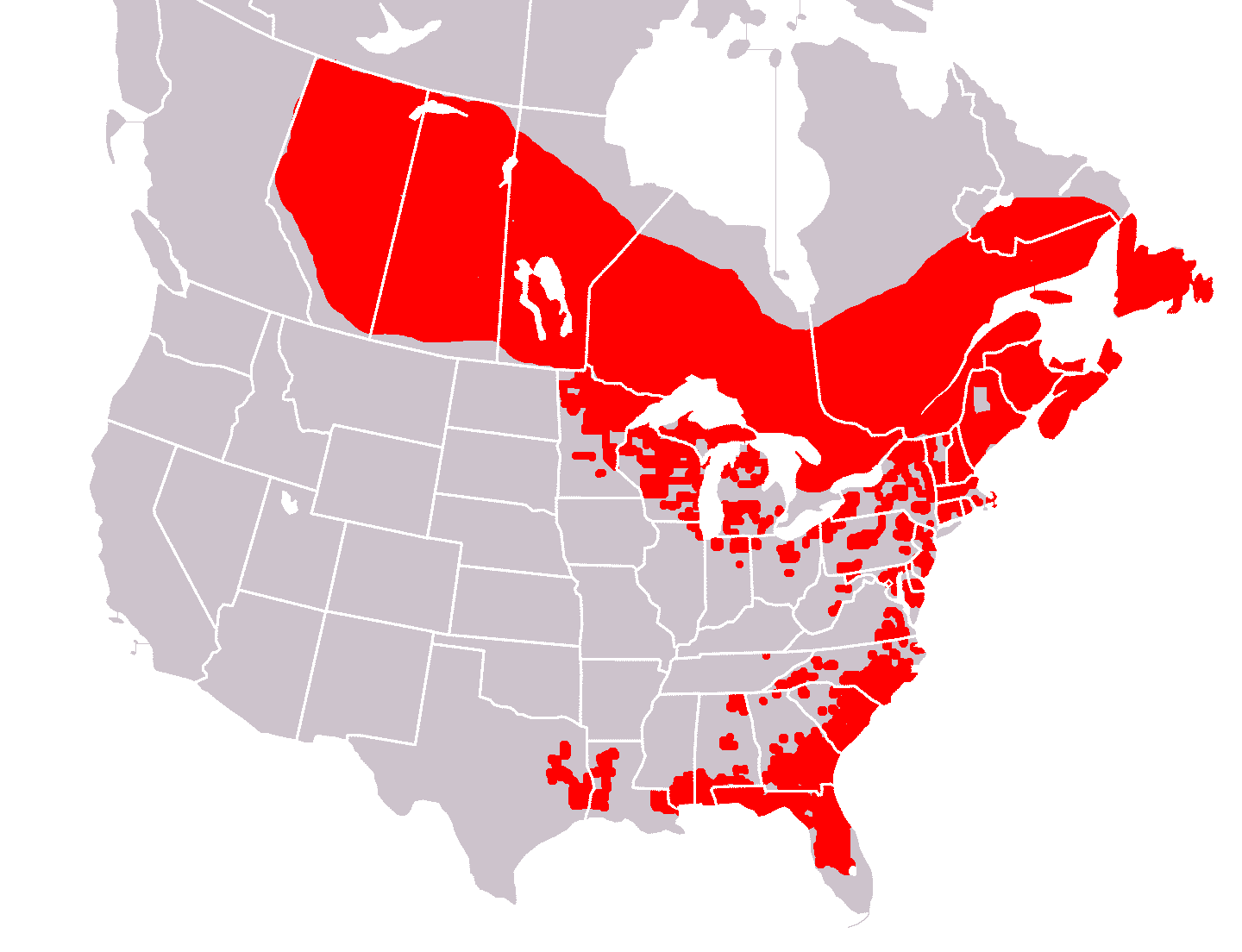
- Sarracenia range (all species)

= Sarracenia =

Genus of carnivorous plants

Sarracenia (/ˌsærəˈsiːniə/ or /ˌsærəˈsɛniə/) is a genus comprising 8 to 11 species of North American pitcher plants, commonly called trumpet pitchers. The genus belongs to the family Sarraceniaceae, which also contain the closely allied genera Darlingtonia and Heliamphora.

Sarracenia is a genus of carnivorous plants indigenous to the eastern seaboard of the United States, Texas, the Great Lakes area and southeastern Canada, with most species occurring only in the south-east United States (only S. purpurea occurs in cold-temperate regions). The plant's leaves have evolved into a funnel or pitcher shape in order to trap insects.

The plant attracts its insect prey with secretions from extrafloral nectaries on the lip of the pitcher leaves, as well as a combination of the leaves' color and scent. Slippery footing at the pitcher's rim causes insects to fall inside, where they die and are digested by the plant with proteases and other enzymes.

== Description ==
Sarracenia trap insects using pitchers with nectar and slippery footing around the lip

Sarracenia are herbaceous perennial plants that grow from a subterranean rhizome, with many tubular pitcher-shaped leaves radiating out from the growing point, and then turning upwards with their trap openings facing the center of the crown. The trap is a vertical tube with a 'hood' (the operculum) extending over its entrance; and below it the top of the tube usually has a rolled lip (the peristome) which secretes nectar and scents. The hood itself frequently produces nectar too, but in lesser quantities. Many Sarracenia species also make a second, strictly photosynthetic, type of leaf termed a phyllode which is entire and lanceolate.

The inside of the pitcher tube, depending on the species, can be divided into three to five distinguishable zones: zone 1 is the operculum (or hood), zone 2 is the peristome and rest of the trap entrance, while zones 3 and 4 (which in some species are combined) and 5 (only present in S. purpurea) are further divisions of the actual tube. Each of these zones has a specific function, with corresponding morphophysiological characteristics.

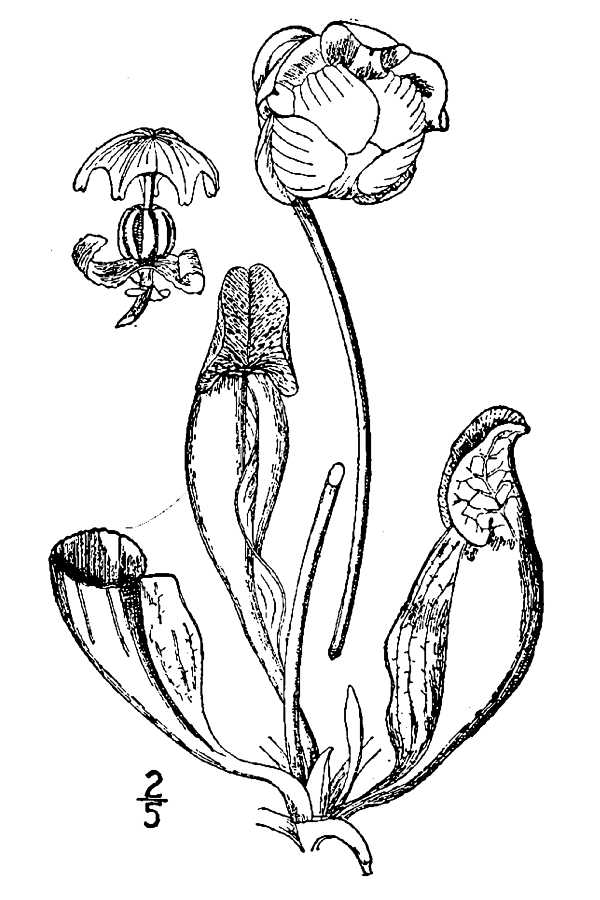
The anatomy of S. purpurea

- Zone 1: Operculum. In most species the operculum covers at least part of the pitcher has an opening, preventing rain from excessively filling the pitcher, which would result in the loss of prey and dilute the digestive fluid. The operculum also serves to guide prey to the pitcher opening, using a combination of colors, scents, and downward-pointing hairs to lead insects toward the trap entrance. Some species, specifically S. minor and S. psittacina, have opercula that hang low over the pitcher entrance. These are also studded with chlorophyll-free patches, translucent "windows" which confuse prey into attempting to fly through the operculum, thereby causing them to cascade down the pitcher tube. (A similar, more sophisticated mechanism is also found in the closely related Darlingtonia californica).
- Zone 2: Peristome and trap entrance. This zone is composed mainly of the peristome, which produces copious amounts of nectar, luring insect prey to land or crawl onto the perilous footing surrounding the pitcher trap. This zone also includes the waxy upper portion of the pitcher tube. Footing on this zone is especially treacherous, as the waxy deposits on surface of this zone cause unwary insects to lose their footing and tumble into the pitcher depths.
- Zone 3: Located below Zone 2, this zone features a leaf surface with non-existent footing, as well as a coating of ultra-fine, downward pointing hairs. Insects that have made it this far lose any chance of escape. It is also studded with digestive glands, which secrete digestive enzymes into the digestive fluid.
- Zone 4: This is the final zone in most species. It is filled with digestive fluids, and readily absorbs nutrients released from the insects by the work of the digestive enzymes and bacteria in the pitcher fluid. Along with more digestive glands, this zone features a thick coating of coarse downward pointing hairs, which makes escape from the digestive fluids impossible.
- Zone 5: This zone, located below Zone 4 and found only in S. purpurea, is smooth, glabrous, lacks glands, and does not serve as an absorptive zone. Its function is unknown.

=== Carnivorous mechanism ===
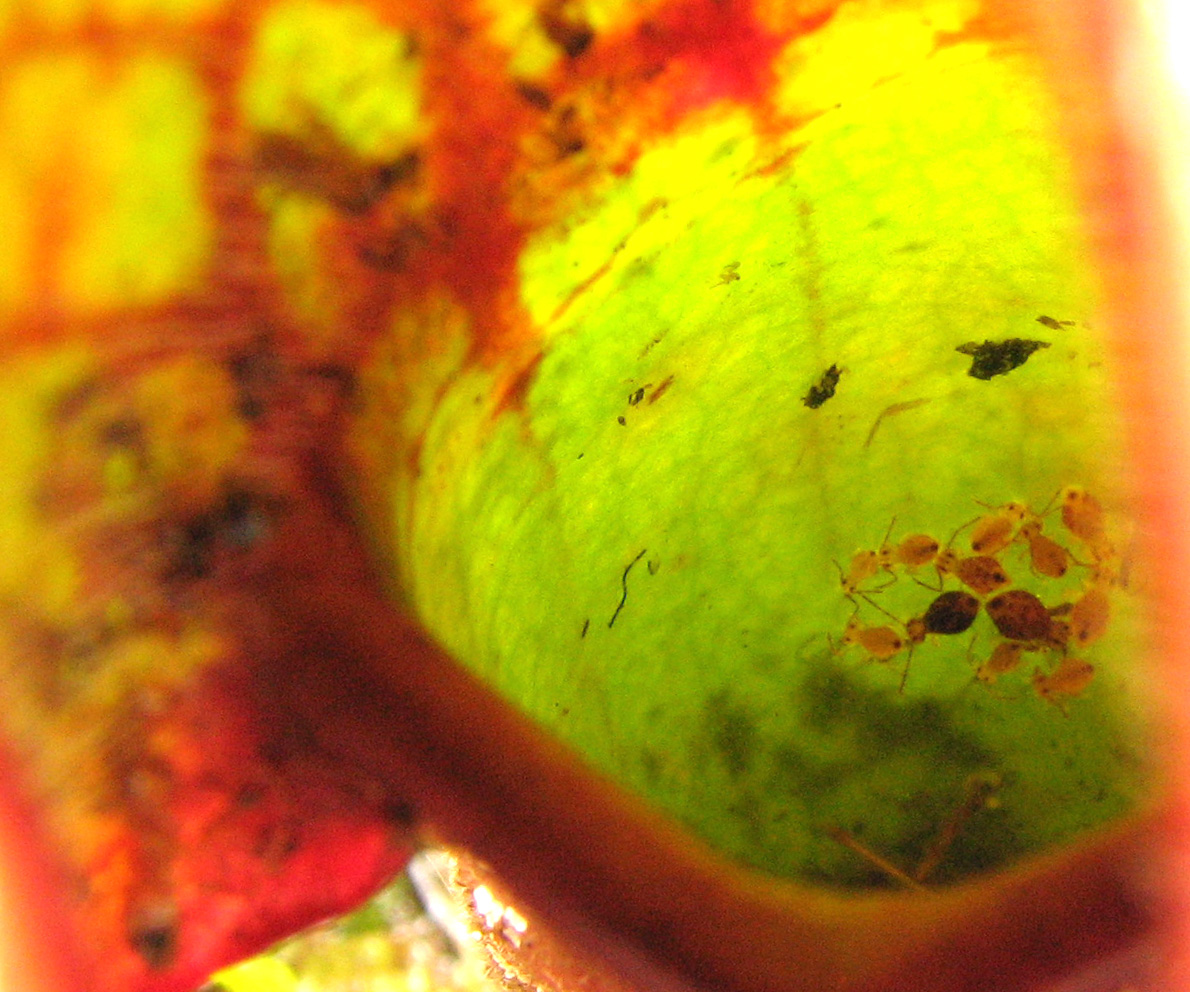
Globular springtails (Dicyrtomina minuta) caught inside S. purpurea

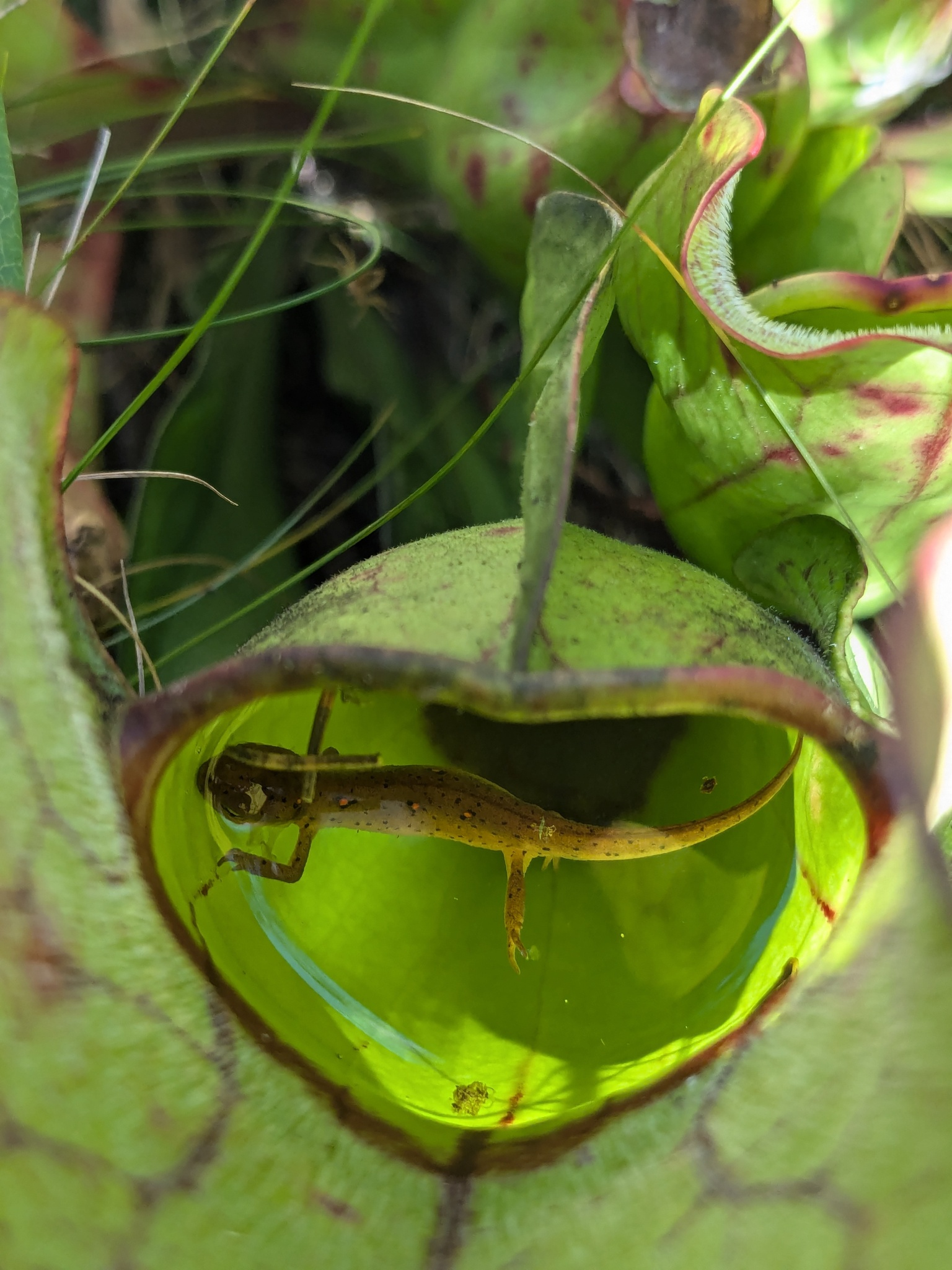
S. purpurea has been extensively recorded capturing and feeding on young eastern newts.

All Sarracenia trap insects and other prey without the use of moving parts. Their traps are static and are based on a combination of lures (including color, scent, and nectar) and inescapability – typically the entrances to the traps are one-way by virtue of the highly adapted features listed above.

Most species use a combination of scent, waxy deposits (to clog insect feet) and gravity to topple insect prey into their pitcher. Once inside, the insect finds the footing very slippery with a waxy surface covering the walls of the pitcher. Further down the tube, downward-pointing hairs make retreat impossible, and in the lowest region of the tube, a pool of liquid containing digestive enzymes and wetting agents quickly drowns the prey and begins digestion. The exoskeletons are usually not digested, and over the course of the summer fill up the pitcher tube.

Only S. purpurea normally contains significant amounts of rainwater in its tubular pitchers. It is a myth that all species contain water. In fact, the hoods of the other species help to keep out rain water in addition to keeping flying prey from escaping.

S. psittacina, the parrot pitcher, uses a lobster-pot style trap that will admit prey (including tadpoles and small fish during floods) but not allow it to find its way out; and sharp inward-pointing hairs force the victim gradually down to the base of the pitcher where it is digested.

==== Potential narcotic function of coniine ====
Coniine, a toxic alkaloid also present in poison hemlock, was first detected in the nectar of S. flava. and has since been detected in seven other species of Sarracenia. While it was demonstrated that concentrated extracts from S. flava could paralyze ants, it has not been demonstrated that coniine has narcotic effects on insects at the concentrations naturally present in pitchers of S. flava. Other authors hypothesize that coniine may function as an attractant for insects, or may function both as an attractant and a narcotic.

=== Flowers and seeds ===
Cutaway view of a Sarracenia flower

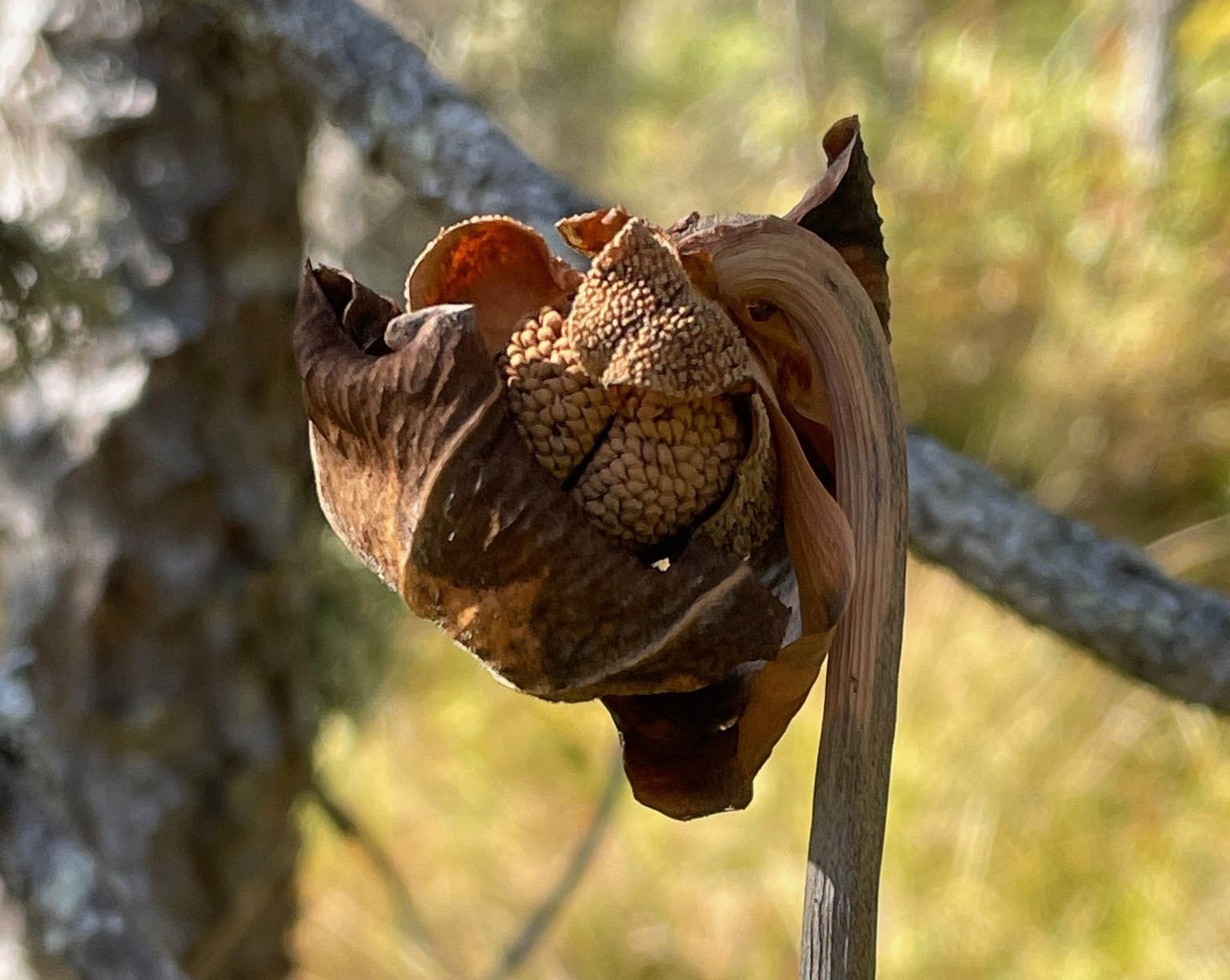
S. purpurea seed pod

Flowers are produced early in spring, with or slightly ahead of the first pitchers. They are held singly on long stems, generally well above the pitcher traps to avoid the trapping of potential pollinators. The flowers, which depending on species are 3–10 centimeters in diameter, are dramatic and have an elaborate design which prevents self-pollination. It consists of five sepals superintended by three bracts, numerous anthers, and an umbrella-like five-pointed style, over which five long yellow or red petals dangle. The whole flower is held upside-down, so that the umbrella-like style catches the pollen dropped by the anthers. The stigmas are located at the tips of the umbrella-like style. The primary pollinators are bees. Bees searching for nectar must force their way past one of the stigmas to enter the chamber formed by the style. Inside, they will inevitably come in contact with a lot of pollen, both from the hanging anthers and from the pollen collected by the style. Upon exiting, the bees must force their way under one of the flap-like petals. This keeps them away from the stigma, avoiding self-pollination. The next flower visited receives on its stigmata some of the first flower's pollen, and the cycle continues. Only the orchid genus Coryanthes has a more ingenious pollination scheme.

Floral formula: Ca^{5} Co^{5} A^{∞} G^{(5)}

The flowers of almost all species are scented. The scent varies, but is often strong and sometimes unpleasant. S. flava has an especially strong odor resembling cat urine.

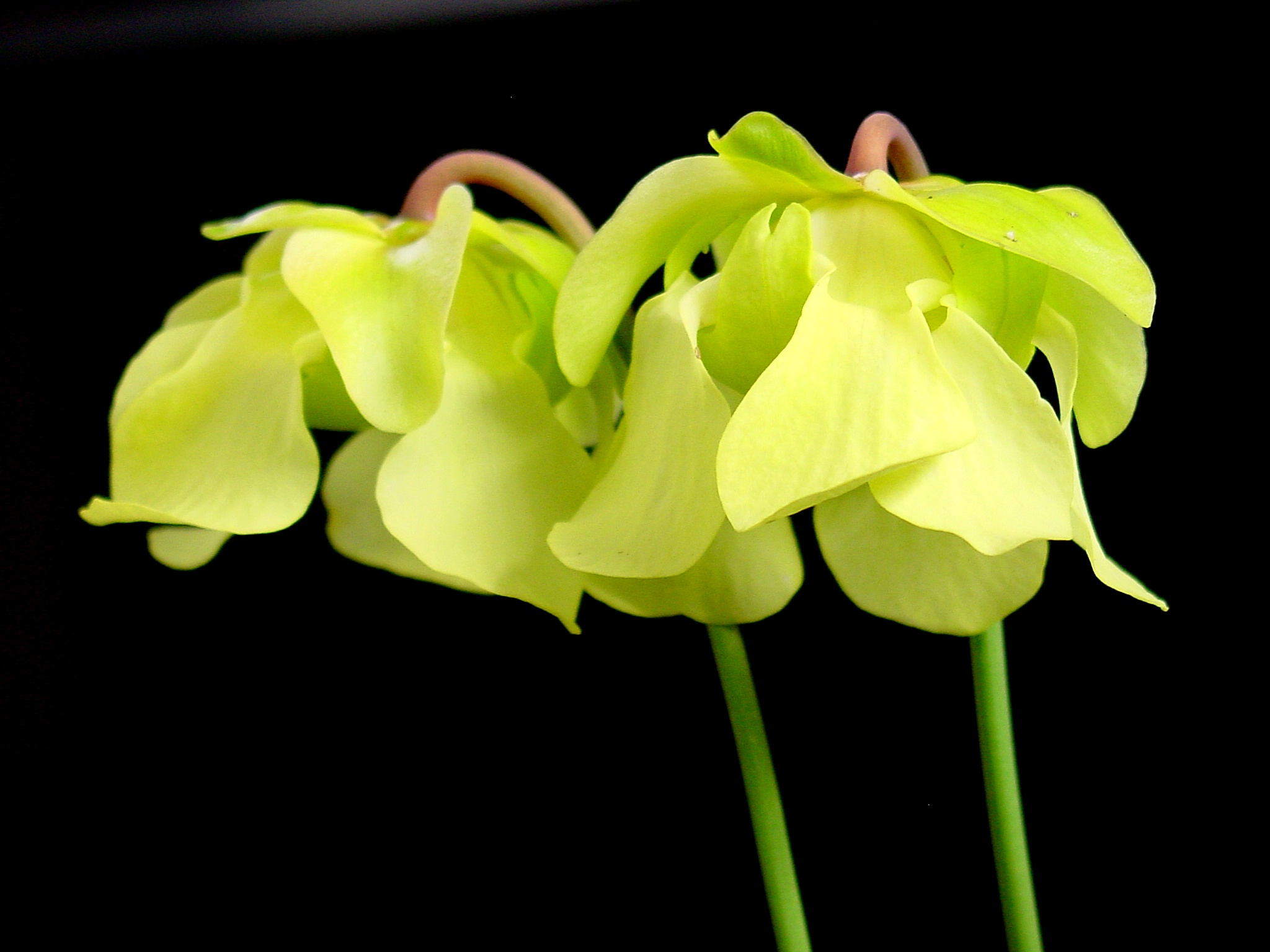
Sarracenia alata flowers

Flowers generally last about two weeks. At the end of the flowering period, the petals drop and the ovary, if pollinated, begins to swell. The seed forms in five lobes, with one lobe producing significantly smaller numbers of seeds than the other lobes. On average, 300–600 seeds are produced, depending on species and pollination success. Seed takes five months to mature, at which point the seed pod turns brown and splits open, scattering seed. The seeds are 1.5–2 mm in length and have a rough, waxy coat which makes it hydrophobic, possibly for seed dispersal by flowing water. Sarracenia seed requires a stratification period to germinate in large numbers. Plants grown from seed start producing functioning traps almost immediately, although they differ in morphology from adult traps for the first year or so, being simpler in structure. Plants require 3–5 years to reach maturity from seed.

=== Growth cycle ===
Pitcher production begins at the end of the flowering period in spring, and lasts until late autumn. At the end of autumn, the pitchers begin to wither and the plants produce non-carnivorous leaves called phyllodia, which play a role in the economics of carnivory in these species. Since the supply of insects during winter is decreased, and the onset of cold weather slows plant metabolism and other processes, putting energy into producing carnivorous leaves would be uneconomical for the plant.

=== Genetics ===
The genus has been found to have a chromosome number of 2n=26, though some earlier studies had found that number to be 2n=24.

=== Ecology ===
Sarracenia pitchers are ecosystems that host a wide variety of species. Many are dependent on Sarracenia for survival, e.g., the larvae of Fletcherimyia flesh flies and Exyra moths feed exclusively on Sarracenia pitchers, while the moth Papaipema appasionata feeds exclusively on Sarracenia rhizomes as larvae.

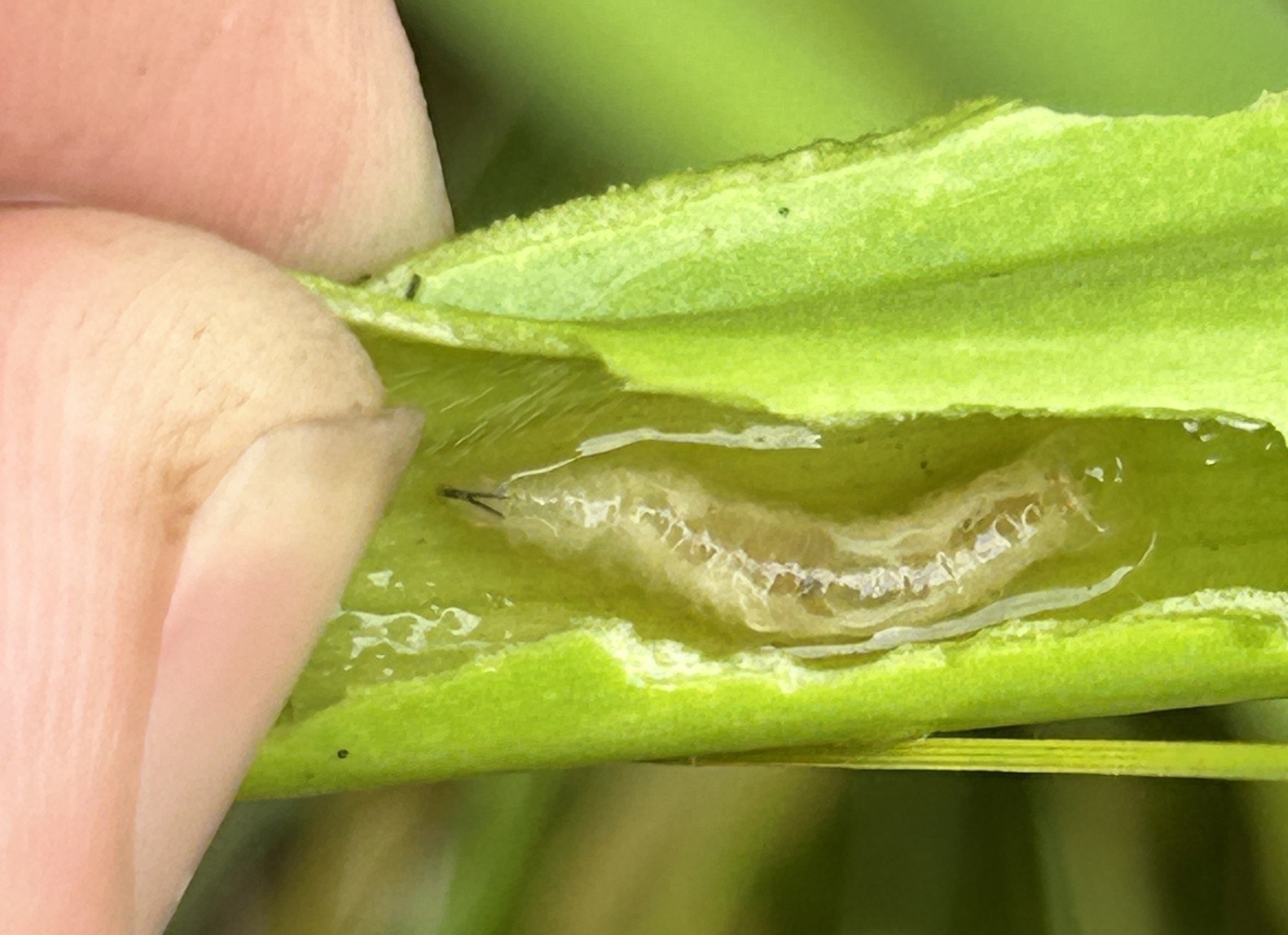
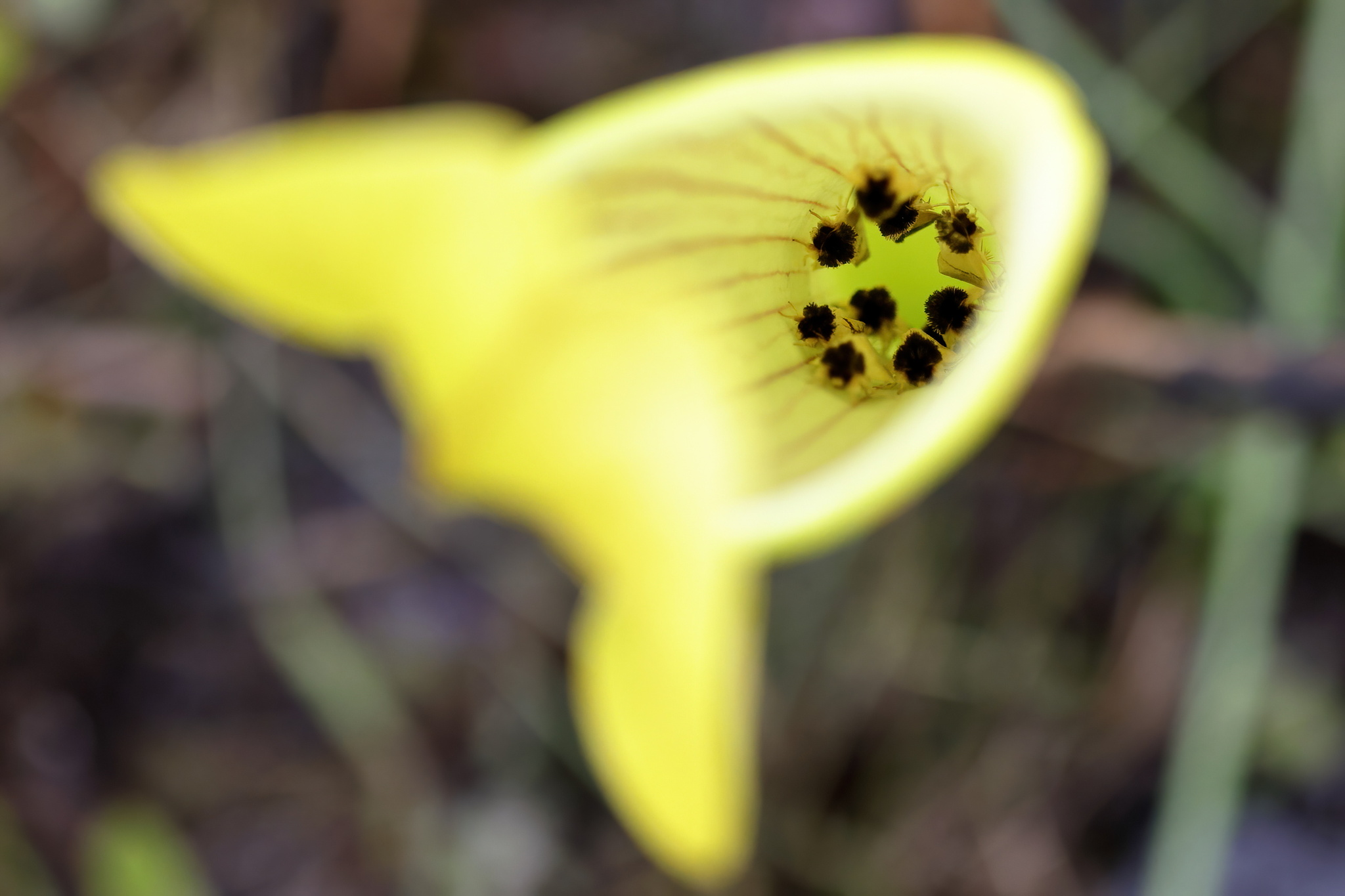
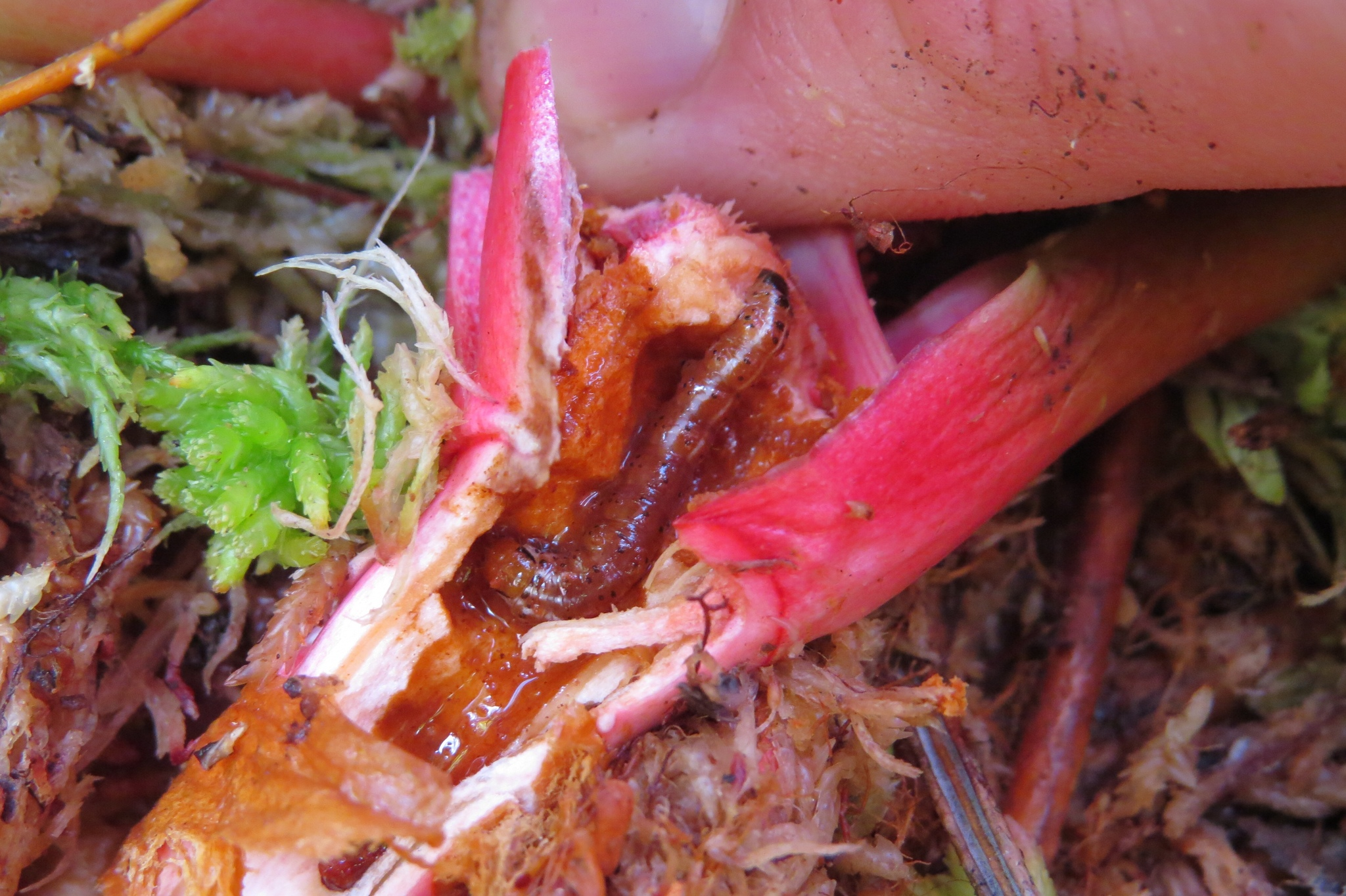
The larvae of Fletcherimyia flesh flies (left), Exyra moths (middle), and the moth Papaipema appassionata (right) feed exclusively on Sarracenia.

== Range and habitat ==
A Sphagnum peat bog with Sarracenia purpurea in the New Jersey Pine Barrens. These habitats are constantly wet, acidic, and low in nutrients.

Seven of the eight species are confined to the south-eastern coastal plain of the United States. One species, S. purpurea, continues north and west well into Canada. The typical habitat is warm-temperate; all Sarracenia are perennial and require a distinct summer and winter. A few subspecies or varieties (S. rubra subsp. alabamensis, S. rubra subsp. jonesii, and S. purpurea var. montana) can be found more inland in mountains (e.g. the Appalachian Mountains).

Sarracenia tend to inhabit fens, herb bogs, and seasonally wet grasslands. These habitats tend to be acidic (low pH) with soil made up of sand and Sphagnum moss. Frequently, the soil will be poor in nutrients, particularly nitrates, and often continuously leached by moving water or made unavailable to the plant roots by the low pH. The plants gain their advantage from their ability to extract nutrients from insect prey in this mineral-poor environment. The plants prefer strong, direct sunlight with no shade. Sarracenia habitats in the southeastern Coastal Plain consist primarily of fire-maintained pine savannas, wet prairies, or seepage bogs. Without frequent fire (1–3 years), these habitats undergo ecological succession and are quickly invaded by woody shrubs and trees, which eliminate Sarracenia by increasing shade and reducing soil moisture.

In several cases, carnivorous plant enthusiasts have introduced S. purpurea into suitable habitats outside of its natural range, where it has naturalized. Some of these populations are decades old; the oldest known occurrence in the Swiss Jura Mountains is around one hundred years old. Besides Switzerland, such naturalized populations can be found in Ireland, England (Lake District), Germany (Bavaria, Lusatia) and in Mendocino County along the California coast.

== Environmental status ==
Sarracenia are threatened in the wild by development and the drainage of their habitat. Estimates indicated that 97.5% of Sarracenia habitat has already been destroyed in the southeastern U.S., the home of all but one species of Sarracenia. Currently the biggest threats to surviving populations are urban development, drainage of habitat for forestry, runoff of herbicides from agriculture, fire suppression, cut pitcher trade for floristry, and plant trade. The latter two threaten survival of Sarracenia not only through depletion of healthy population, but also because of the damaging effects (soil compaction and altered moisture levels) of repeated foot and vehicular traffic that comes with harvesting. The Fish and Wildlife Service estimates that approximately 1.6 million pitchers were cut for the domestic market in 1991.

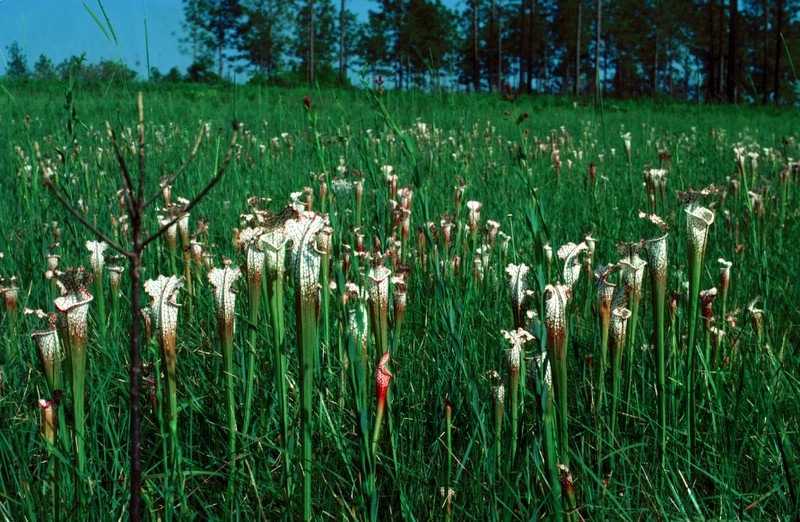
A field with S. leucophylla. Scenes such as this used to be common in the coastal plains of the southeast US.

Some protective legislation exists. Several southeastern states, such as Florida, Georgia, and South Carolina have conservation laws which protect Sarracenia. However, most of the remaining wetlands in the southeastern U.S. are privately owned. Plants on this land are not protected by state legislation. The key states of Alabama and Mississippi have no such legislation at all, so that even plants on public land have no protection. Three Sarracenia have been listed as "Federally Endangered" under the USA Endangered Species Act (1973) – S. rubra subsp. alabamensis (S. alabamensis) in Alabama, S. rubra subsp. jonesii (S. jonesii) in North and South Carolina, and S. oreophila in Alabama, Georgia, and North Carolina. These taxa are also on CITES Appendix I, giving them international protection by making export of wild-collected plants illegal. The other species, while appearing on CITES Appendix II, have little federal protection.

Some efforts have been made to curb the existing threats to plants. In 2003 the International Carnivorous Plant Society ran a trial distribution program in which young S. rubra subsp. alabamanensis plants were grown from seed collected from 3 of the 12 known S. alabamanensis sites, and were distributed to members in an attempt to increase availability of this plant in cultivation, with the hopes of thereby decreasing the poaching that was endangering the survival of this taxon in the wild.

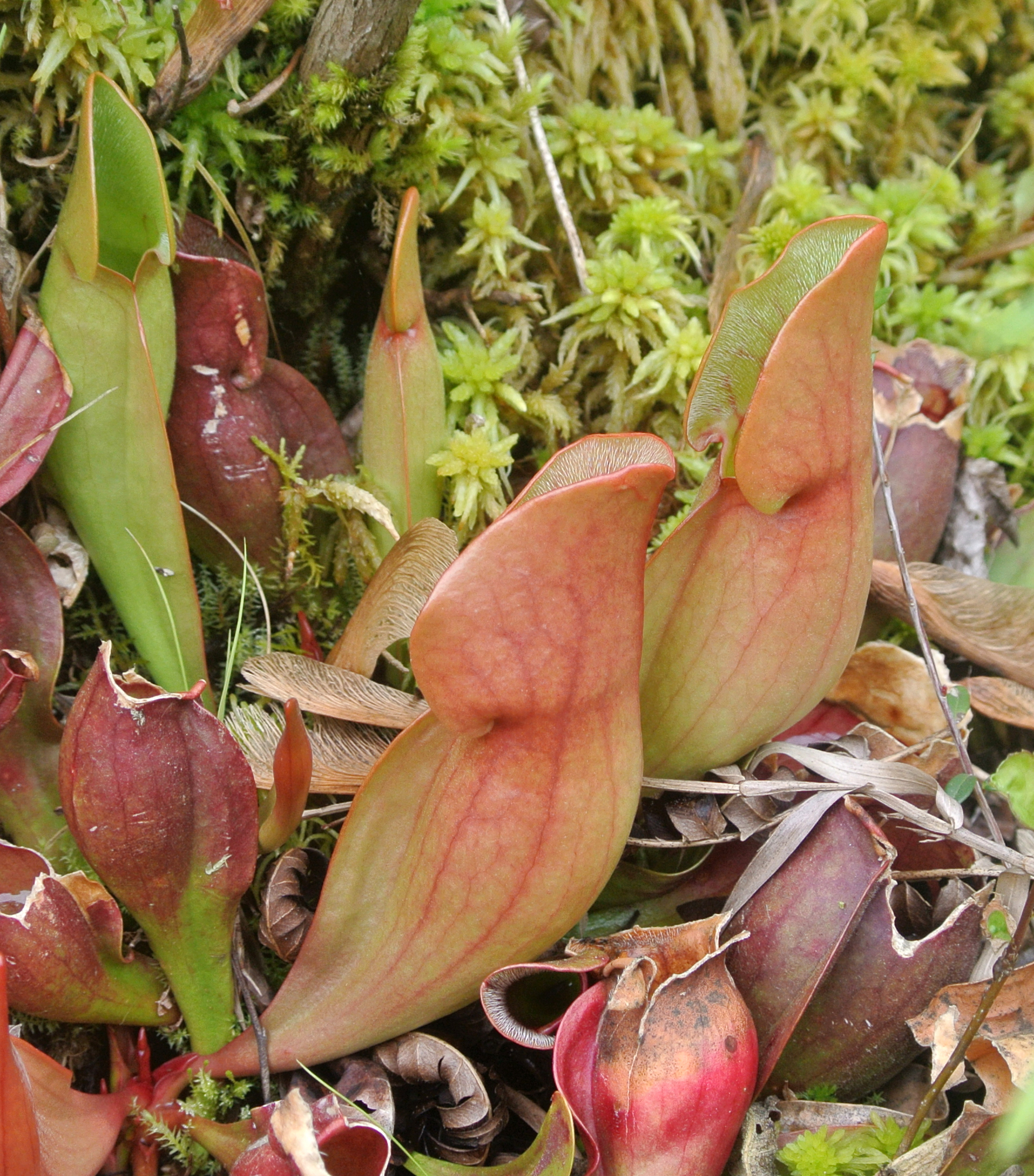
Sarracenia purpurea pitchers at Brown's Lake Bog, Ohio.

In 1995, the non-profit organization Meadowview Biological Research Station was created to preserve and restore pitcher plant bogs and associated ecosystems in Maryland and Virginia.

In 2004, a number of concerned plant enthusiasts founded the North American Sarracenia Conservancy (NASC), which aims to "serve as a living record of the taxonomic, morphological and genetic diversity of the genus Sarracenia for purposes of conservation and cultivation." The NASC is a grassroots Nebraska nonprofit organization working to build a genetic Sarracenia bank by overseeing the maintenance of genetic strains from all remaining wild populations in cultivation, with the eventual aim of being able to supply these strains for re-introduction in suitable habitats. A similar but centralized collection exists in the UK, with 2000+ clones representing all species (many with location data) and numerous hybrids currently being housed by Sarracenia expert Mike King. This UK collection is part of the NCCPG National Plant Collection scheme. While none of these efforts curb the biggest threats – urban development and habitat destruction – they aim to help reduce plant poaching while at the same time making these plants available to future generations.

One of the biggest challenges of reintroducing plants back into the wild is the unintended introduction of unwanted species, such as pests, diseases, and invasive weeds. Often, it is human destruction of areas in which the Sarracenia thrive that is a major killer. Aside from determining what genetic material is appropriate for reintroduction (which is up for debate), plants must be semi-aseptic to keep the habitat pristine and sustainable in the long term. Another challenge is maintaining all of the introduced plant material and determining an optimal site to plant them in. A single hurricane or storm event can change the dynamics of a field. Even within a single bog, some areas may be waterlogged, while other areas may become very dry, so identifying the right location is critical. Short term results on private property indicate planting larger specimens into the field have a higher chance of long-term survival compared to planting smaller seedlings.

== Taxonomy ==
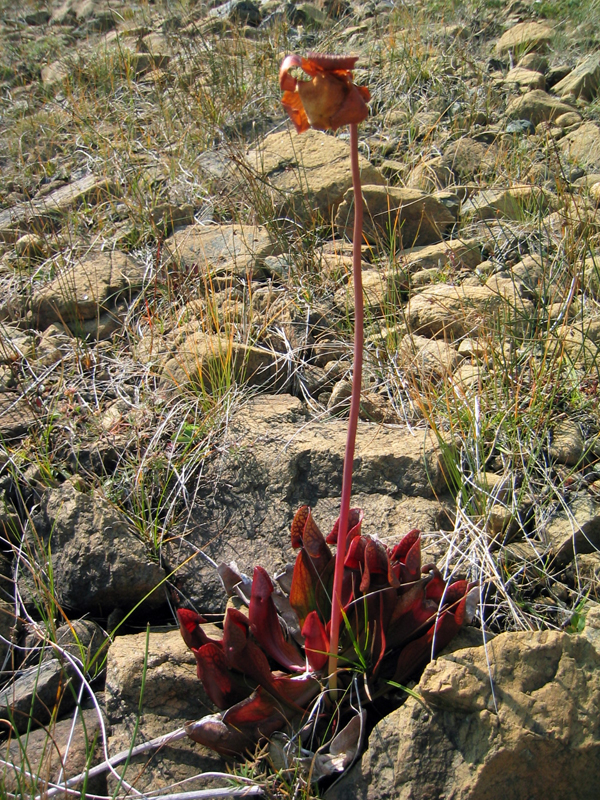
A flowering specimen of the highly variable Sarracenia purpurea

The genus Sarracenia belongs to the family Sarraceniaceae, which also contain the closely allied genera Darlingtonia and Heliamphora. Under the Cronquist system, this family was put in the order Nepenthales along with Nepenthaceae and Droseraceae. The APG II system, however, assigns Sarraceniaceae to the order Ericales and the other two families to the order Caryophyllales.

Typically anywhere from 8 to 11 species of Sarracenia are generally recognized, depending on individual opinions on the biological species concept and which among many subspecies and varieties should be elevated to species status, a common lumping and splitting problem in demarcation. Some authorities split the described subspecific taxa of S. rubra into 3 to 5 species. Similarly, S. rosea is not always recognized as a species distinct from S. purpurea. The most commonly recognized species include:

Species	Authority	Year	Image	Distribution
Sarracenia alabamensis	Case & R.B.Case	2005		Alabama, eastern Mississippi and Florida.
Sarracenia alata Pale pitcher plant	(Alph.Wood) Alph.Wood	1863		eastern Louisiana across southern Mississippi and into western Alabama and a western range from eastern Texas into western Louisiana.
Sarracenia flava Yellow pitcher plant	L.	1753		southern Alabama, through Florida and Georgia, southern Virginia, North Carolina and South Carolina.
Sarracenia jonesii	Wherry	1929		North Carolina and South Carolina.
Sarracenia leucophylla White pitcher plant	Raf.	1817		west of the Apalachicola River on the Florida Panhandle. It is also found in Alabama, Georgia, Louisiana, Mississippi, and North Carolina
Sarracenia minor Hooded pitcher plant	Walt.	1803		northern Florida and in Georgia up to the southern part of North Carolina.
Sarracenia oreophila Green pitcher plant	(Kearney) Wherry	1933		northern Alabama, North Carolina, Georgia, and—historically—Tennessee
Sarracenia psittacina Parrot pitcher plant	Michx.	1803		Louisiana, Alabama, Mississippi, Florida, Georgia
Sarracenia purpurea Purple pitcher plant	L.	1753		Eastern seaboard, the Great Lakes region, Canada (except Nunavut and Yukon), Washington state, and Alaska.
Sarracenia rosea	Naczi, Case & R.B.Case	1999		Mississippi to Georgia.
Sarracenia rubra Sweet pitcher plant	Walt.	1788		southern Mississippi, through southern Alabama, the Florida panhandle and Georgia, to the coastal plains of Virginia and South Carolina.

Currently, S. rubra can be described as having six subspecies, though it is sometimes argued that the subspecies should be elevated to species rank in recognition of the species complex that they are a part of. This division would yield S. alabamensis, S. gulfensis, S. jonesii, S. rubra sensu stricto, S. viatorum, and S. wherryi. Others have argued that only some of these demand recognition at the species rank.

=== McPherson and Schnell (2011) ===
Stewart McPherson and Donald Schnell carried out a comprehensive taxonomic revision of the genus in their 2011 monograph, Sarraceniaceae of North America. They recognized the following taxa:

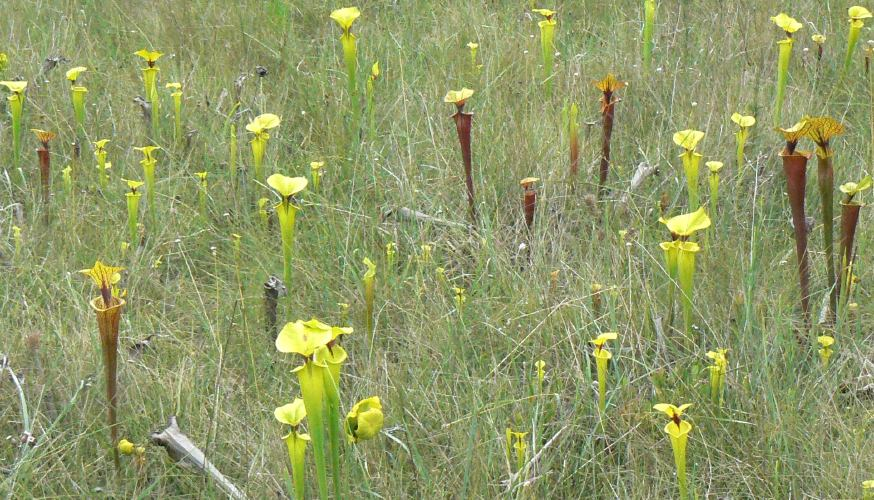
A "pitcher plant meadow" in the Florida panhandle, with mixed varieties of Sarracenia flava: var. ornata, var. rubricorpora, and var. rugelii.

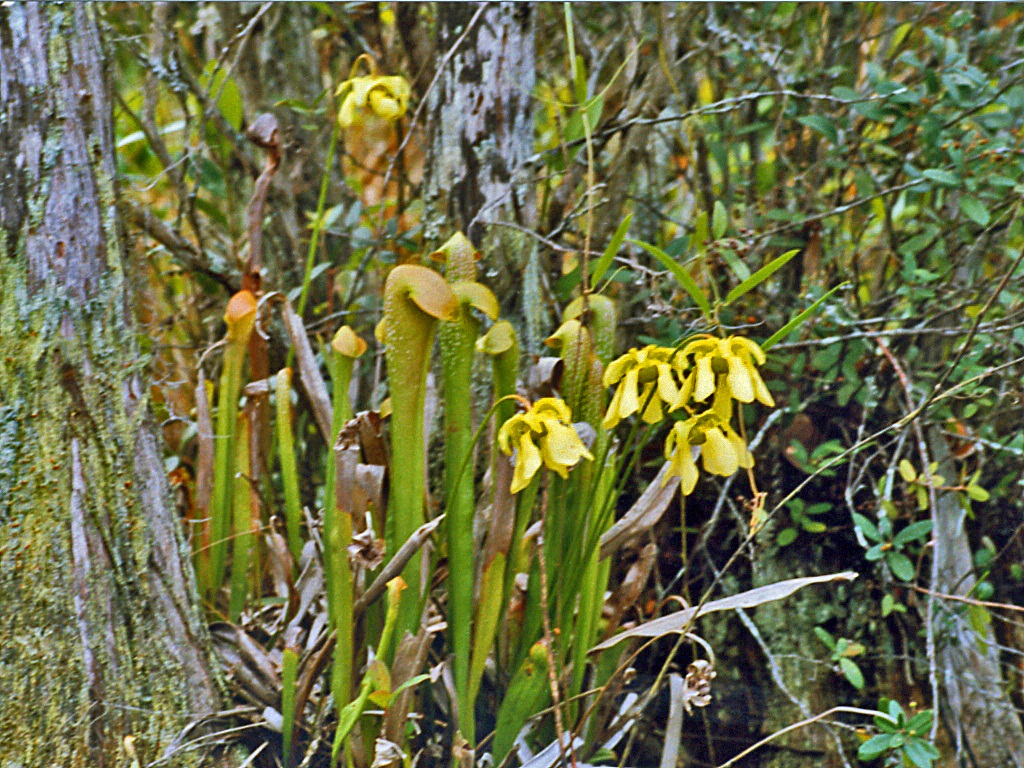
Plants of Sarracenia minor var. okefenokeensis in Okefenokee Swamp Park

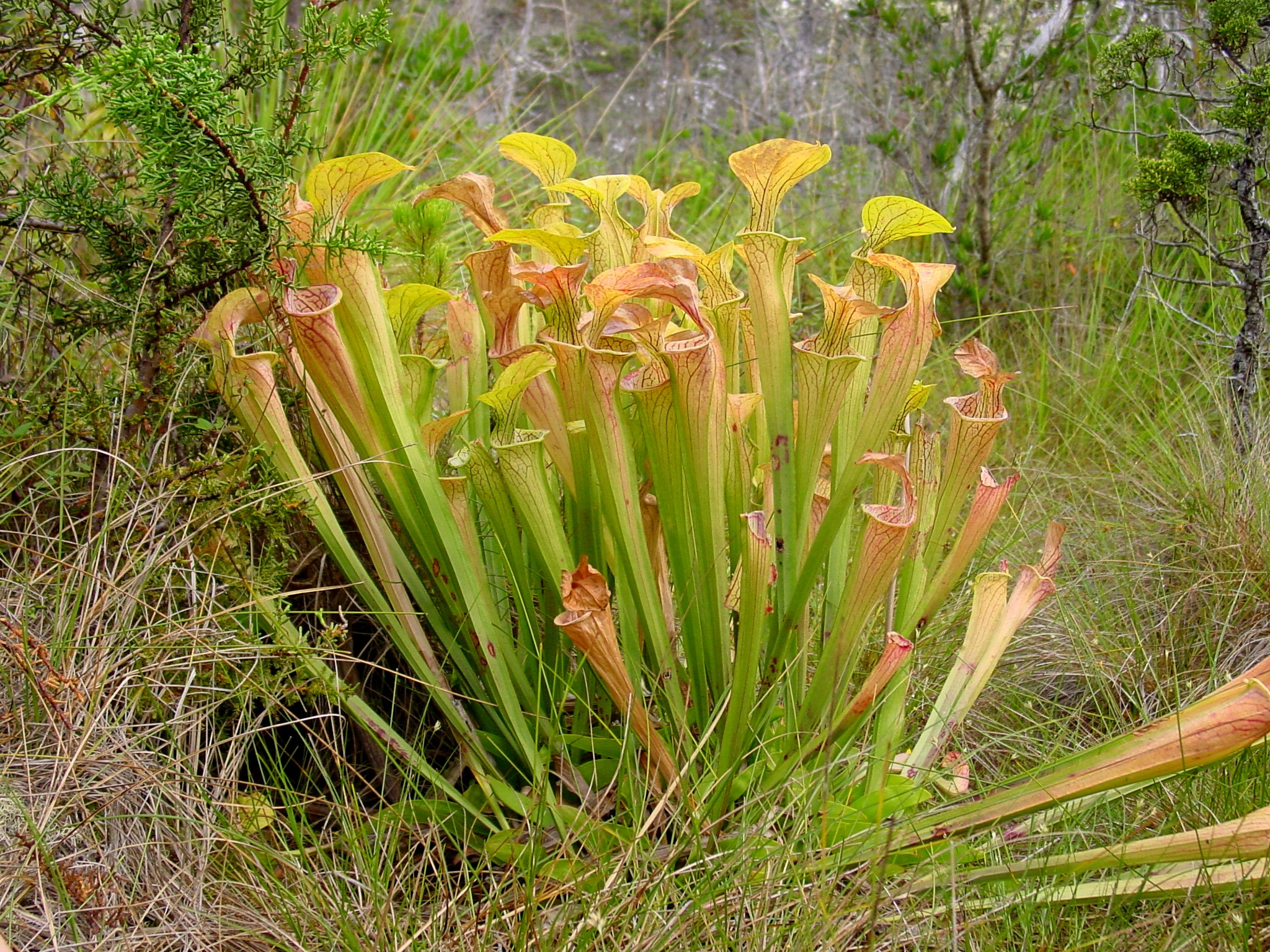
A clump of Sarracenia oreophila in habitat

- Sarracenia alata
  - S. alata var. alata (autonym)
    - S. alata var. alata f. viridescens S.McPherson & D.E.Schnell^{[nb a]}
  - S. alata var. atrorubra S.McPherson & D.E.Schnell
  - S. alata var. cuprea S.McPherson & D.E.Schnell
  - S. alata var. nigropurpurea P.D'Amato ex S.McPherson & D.E.Schnell
  - S. alata var. ornata S.McPherson & D.E.Schnell
  - S. alata var. rubrioperculata S.McPherson & D.E.Schnell
- Sarracenia flava
  - S. flava var. flava (autonym)
    - S. flava var. flava f. viridescens S.McPherson & D.E.Schnell^{[nb a]}
  - S. flava var. atropurpurea (Hort. W.Bull ex Mast.) Hort. W.Bull ex W.Robinson
  - S. flava var. cuprea D.E.Schnell
  - S. flava var. maxima Hort. W.Bull ex Mast.
  - S. flava var. ornata Hort. Bull ex W.Robinson
  - S. flava var. rubricorpora D.E.Schnell
  - S. flava var. rugelii (Shuttlew. ex A.DC.) Mast.
- Sarracenia leucophylla
  - S. leucophylla var. leucophylla (autonym)
    - S. leucophylla var. leucophylla f. viridescens S.McPherson & D.E.Schnell^{[nb a]}
  - S. leucophylla var. alba (Hort. T.Baines ex R.Hogg & T.Moore) J.Pietropaolo & P.Pietropaolo ex S.McPherson & D.E.Schnell
- Sarracenia minor
  - S. minor var. minor (autonym)
    - S. minor var. minor f. viridescens S.McPherson & D.E.Schnell
  - S. minor var. okefenokeensis D.E.Schnell
- Sarracenia oreophila
  - S. oreophila var. oreophila (autonym)
  - S. oreophila var. ornata S.McPherson & D.E.Schnell
- Sarracenia psittacina
  - S. psittacina var. psittacina (autonym)
    - S. psittacina var. psittacina f. viridescens S.McPherson & D.E.Schnell
  - S. psittacina var. okefenokeensis S.McPherson & D.E.Schnell
    - S. psittacina var. okefenokeensis f. luteoviridis S.McPherson & D.E.Schnell
- Sarracenia purpurea
  - S. purpurea subsp. purpurea (autonym)
    - S. purpurea subsp. purpurea f. heterophylla (Eaton) Fern.
  - S. purpurea subsp. venosa (Raf.) Wherry
    - S. purpurea subsp. venosa var. venosa (autonym)
      - S. purpurea subsp. venosa var. venosa f. pallidiflora S.McPherson & D.E.Schnell
    - S. purpurea subsp. venosa var. burkii D.E.Schnell
      - S. purpurea subsp. venosa var. burkii f. luteola R.L.Hanrahan & J.Miller
    - S. purpurea subsp. venosa var. montana D.E.Schnell & R.O.Determann
- Sarracenia rubra
  - S. rubra subsp. rubra (autonym)
  - S. rubra subsp. alabamensis (Case & R.B.Case) S.McPherson & D.E.Schnell^{[nb b]}
  - S. rubra subsp. gulfensis D.E.Schnell
    - S. rubra subsp. gulfensis f. luteoviridis S.McPherson & D.E.Schnell
  - S. rubra subsp. jonesii (Wherry) Wherry
    - S. rubra subsp. jonesii f. viridescens S.McPherson & D.E.Schnell
  - S. rubra subsp. wherryi (Case & R.B.Case) D.E.Schnell
  - S. rubra "Incompletely diagnosed taxon from Georgia and South Carolina" (Undescribed, but see note below)

Note: The entity McPherson and Schnell referred to as S. rubra "Incompletely diagnosed taxon from Georgia and South Carolina" has since been established as Sarracenia rubra subsp. viatorum B.Rice.

=== Hybrids ===
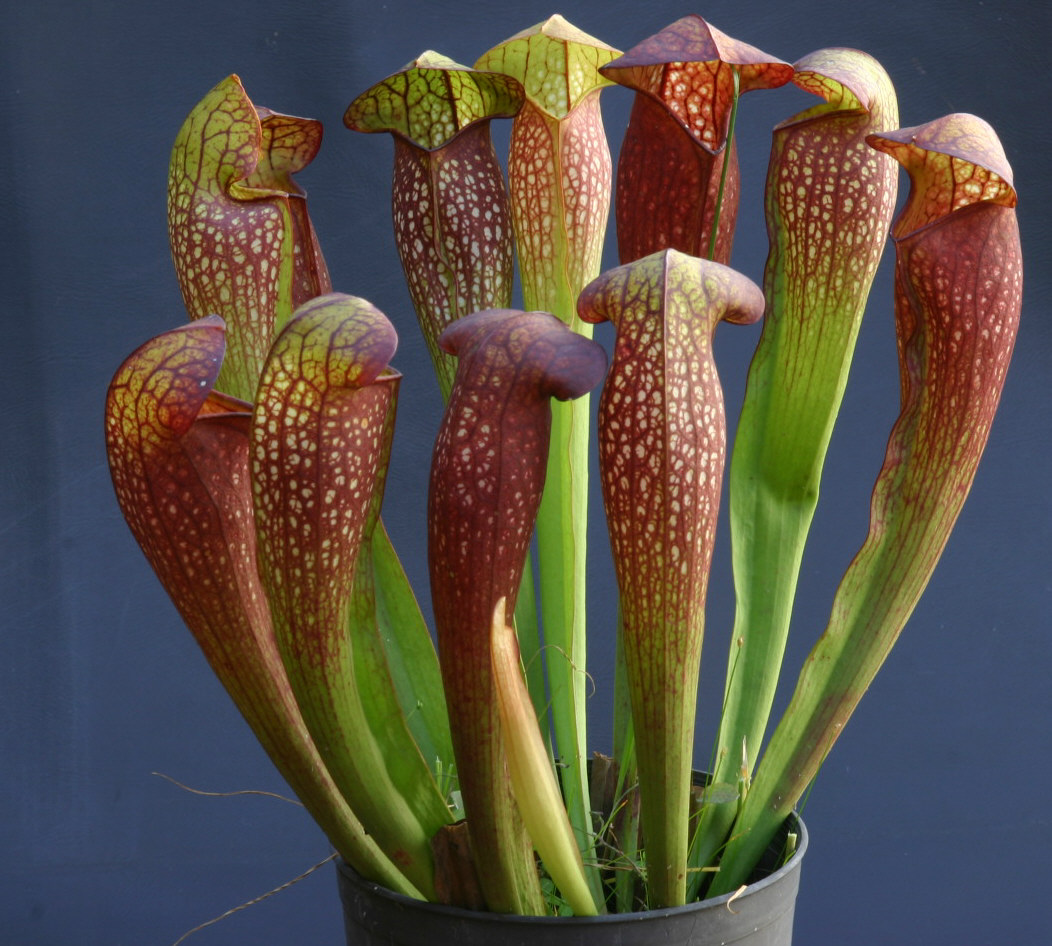
A Sarracenia hybrid

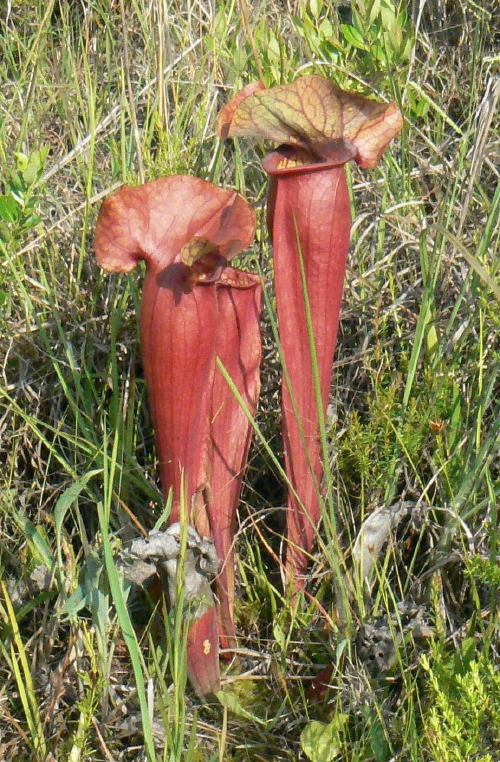
A wild Sarracenia flava × S. purpurea in northwestern Florida

Sarracenia species hybridize and produce fertile offspring freely, making proper classification difficult. Sarracenia hybrids are able to hybridize further, giving the possibility of hundreds of different hybrids that have multiple species in varying amounts in their ancestry. Since many species ranges overlap, natural hybrids are relatively common. As a result, initial classification included many of these hybrids as separate species. A recent census of the number of hybrids and cultivars of Sarracenia species revealed about 100 unique hybrids and cultivars in cultivation. Many hybrids of Sarracenia are still commonly referred to by their obsolete species names, particularly in horticulture. These hybrids are all popularly cultivated by carnivorous plant enthusiasts, and there are consequently a huge number of hybrids and cultivars, most bred for showy pitchers.

Some of the more common named hybrids include:

- Sarracenia × catesbaei = S. flava × S. purpurea
- Sarracenia × moorei = S. flava × S. leucophylla
- Sarracenia × popei = S. flava × S. rubra
- Sarracenia × harperi = S. flava × S. minor
- Sarracenia × alava = S. flava × S. alata
- Sarracenia × mitchelliana = S. purpurea × S. leucophylla
- Sarracenia × exornata = S. purpurea × S. alata
- Sarracenia × chelsonii = S. purpurea × S. rubra
- Sarracenia × swaniana = S. purpurea × S. minor
- Sarracenia × courtii = S. purpurea × S. psittacina
- Sarracenia × pureophila = S. purpurea × S. oreophila
- Sarracenia × readii = S. leucophylla × S. rubra
- Sarracenia × farnhamii = S. leucophylla × S. rubra
- Sarracenia × excellens = S. leucophylla × S. minor
- Sarracenia × areolata = S. leucophylla × S. alata
- Sarracenia × wrigleyana = S. leucophylla × S. psittacina
- Sarracenia × ahlesii = S. alata × S. rubra
- Sarracenia × rehderi = S. rubra × S. minor
- Sarracenia × gilpini = S. rubra × S. psittacina
- Sarracenia × formosa = S. minor × S. psittacina

== Botanical history ==
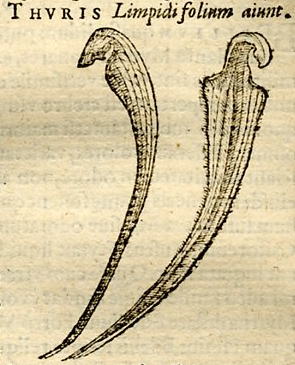
First illustration of a Sarracenia from L'Obel's Stirpium Adversaria Nova, 1576

Sarracenia were known to Europeans as early as the 16th century, within a century of Christopher Columbus' discovery of the New World. L'Obel included an illustration of S. minor in his Stirpium Adversaria Nova in 1576. The first description and plate of a Sarracenia to show up in botanical literature was published by Carolus Clusius, who received a partial dried specimen of what was later determined to be S. purpurea subsp. purpurea, publishing it under the name Limonium peregrinum. The exact origins of this specimen remains unknown, as few explorers are known to have collected plant specimens from the range of this subspecies before that time. Cheek and Young suggest that the most likely source is Cartier's expeditions to what is now Quebec between 1534 and 1541. The fragile flowerless specimen that made its way to Clusius 60 years later was enough to excite his interest, but not enough for him to place it among related plants; his closest guess was the wholly unrelated Sea Lavender genus.

The name Sarracenia was first employed by Michel Sarrazin, the Father of Canadian Botany who in the late 17th century sent live specimens of S. purpurea to the Parisian botanist Joseph Pitton de Tournefort, who thereupon described the species. Linnaeus adopted this name when he published his Species Plantarum (1753), using it for the two known species at the time: S. purpurea and S. flava. The first successful flowering in culture occurred in 1773. In 1793 William Bartram noted in his book about his travels in the southeast U.S. that numerous insects were caught in the pitchers of these plants, but doubted that any benefit could be derived from them. It was not until 1887 that research by Joseph H. Mellichamp proved the carnivorous nature of this genus. This finding was supported by a study by J.S. Hepburn, E.Q. St. John and F.M. Jones in 1920. Extended field surveys and laboratory studies by Edgar Wherry in the 1930s greatly increased the knowledge of this genus, which has further been extended by the more recent works of C. Ritchie Bell (1949–52), Donald E. Schnell (1970–2002), Frederick W. Case (1970–2000s), and T. Lawrence Mellichamp (1980s-2000s).

== Cultivation ==
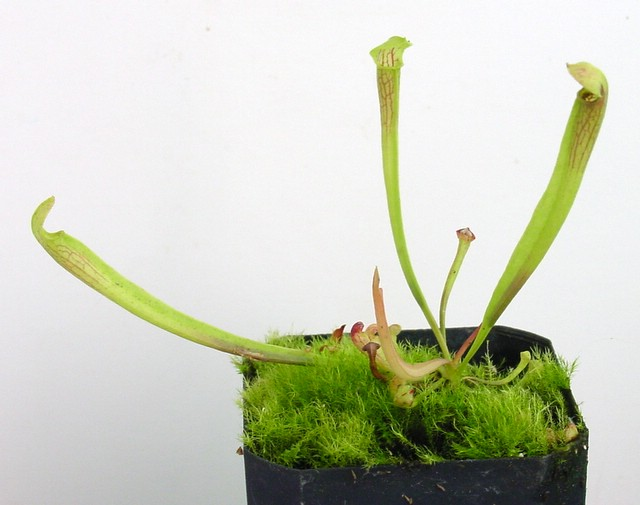
A 2-year-old S. alata seedling, with 1st yr. (small) and 2nd yr. (larger) pitchers

Sarracenia are considered easy to grow and are widely propagated and cultivated by gardeners and carnivorous plant enthusiasts. Several hybrids between the very hardy S. purpurea and showy species like S. leucophylla are becoming common in garden centers in North America and Europe.

Sarracenia require constantly moist-wet, nutrient-free acidic soil. This is most often achieved with a potting mix consisting of peat moss mixed with sand or perlite. As their roots are sensitive to nutrients and minerals, only pure water, such as distilled, rain, or reverse osmosis water, can be used to water them. Sarracenia prefer sunny conditions during their growing season but require a dormancy period, with decreased light and temperatures, of a few months in the winter.

=== Propagation ===
Sarracenia do not self-pollinate and therefore require hand pollination or access to natural pollinators such as bees. Sarracenia pollen remains potent for several weeks when refrigerated, and so is stored by cultivators and used to pollinate later-flowering species. Given that all Sarracenia hybrids are fertile and will hybridize further, this characteristic allows cultivators to produce a limitless number of variants through hybridization.

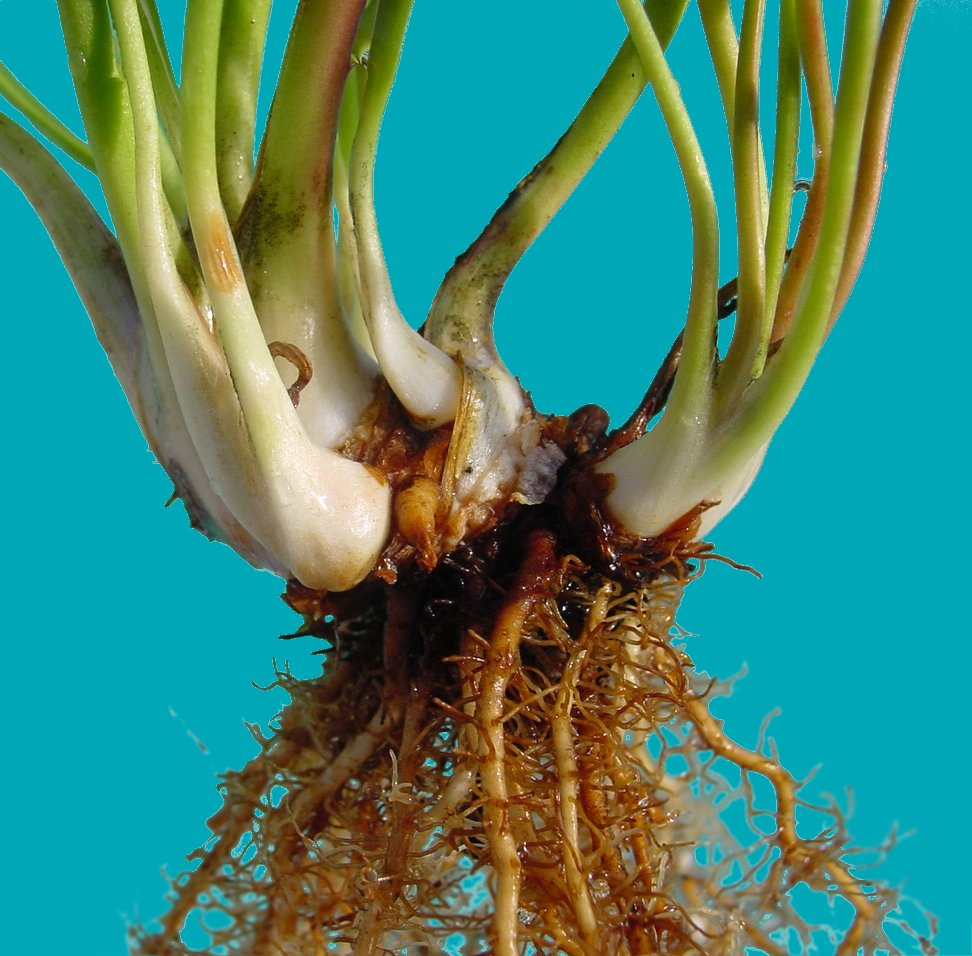
A Sarracenia rhizome with a few growing points, capable of division

The copious seeds store well if kept dry. In climates or seasons that cannot provide the cold, damp period of stratification required by the seeds for germination, growers mimic this condition by placing the seeds in a refrigerator for 2–6 weeks, depending on species. The seeds are sown on the surface of their substrate and germinate when transferred to warmer, bright conditions. Sarracenia seedlings all look alike for the first two or three years; the plants reach maturity after four or five years. Regular fertilization (twice a month between April and September) with a balanced fertilizer at the rate of 1 teaspoon per gallon (using a 15-16-17 peat-lite or similar fertilizer) will speed their growth and time to maturity. It is advisable to leach regularly with pure water to prevent the buildup of solutes (fertilizer salts) in the soil. Deep water in a potted plant keeps the soil too waterlogged for proper root functioning.

Mature Sarracenia are commonly propagated by division. Their rhizomes extend and produce new crowns of pitchers over the course of a few growing seasons, and cultivators divide and separate the rhizomes during the plant's winter dormancy or early in the growing season. This technique is also used to separate sections of rhizomes which have no pitchers: when re-potted, the section usually generates a new crown of pitchers. A further technique is employed to encourage new crowns to appear which does not involve division of the rhizome: small notches up to 5 mm deep are cut into the top of the rhizome, whereupon a new crown frequently develops at the site of the notch.

=== AGM cultivars ===
The following have won the Royal Horticultural Society's Award of Garden Merit:

- Sarracenia 'Anna Carlisle'
- Sarracenia 'Colin Clayton'
- Sarracenia 'Dixie Lace'
- Sarracenia 'Jenny Helen'
- Sarracenia 'Juthatip Soper'
- Sarracenia 'Vogel'
- Sarracenia × catesbaei 'Violet'
- Sarracenia × mitchelliana 'Victoria Morley'
- Sarracenia × moorei 'Brooks's Hybrid'

== See also ==
- North American Sarracenia Conservancy
- Meadowview Biological Research Station
- Heliamphora
- Darlingtonia
- Nepenthes
- Cephalotus

== Notes ==
a. Since McPherson & Schnell (2011) did not assign these forms to any particular variety, they are to be placed under the autonymous variety according to the botanical code.

b. This combination had been published previously, but was only validated in McPherson and Schnell's 2011 monograph.
