= S. rubra =

S. rubra may refer to:

- Sarracenia rubra, the sweet pitcher plant, a carnivorous plant species
- Spergularia rubra, a plant species native of Malta, Sicily and Algiers
