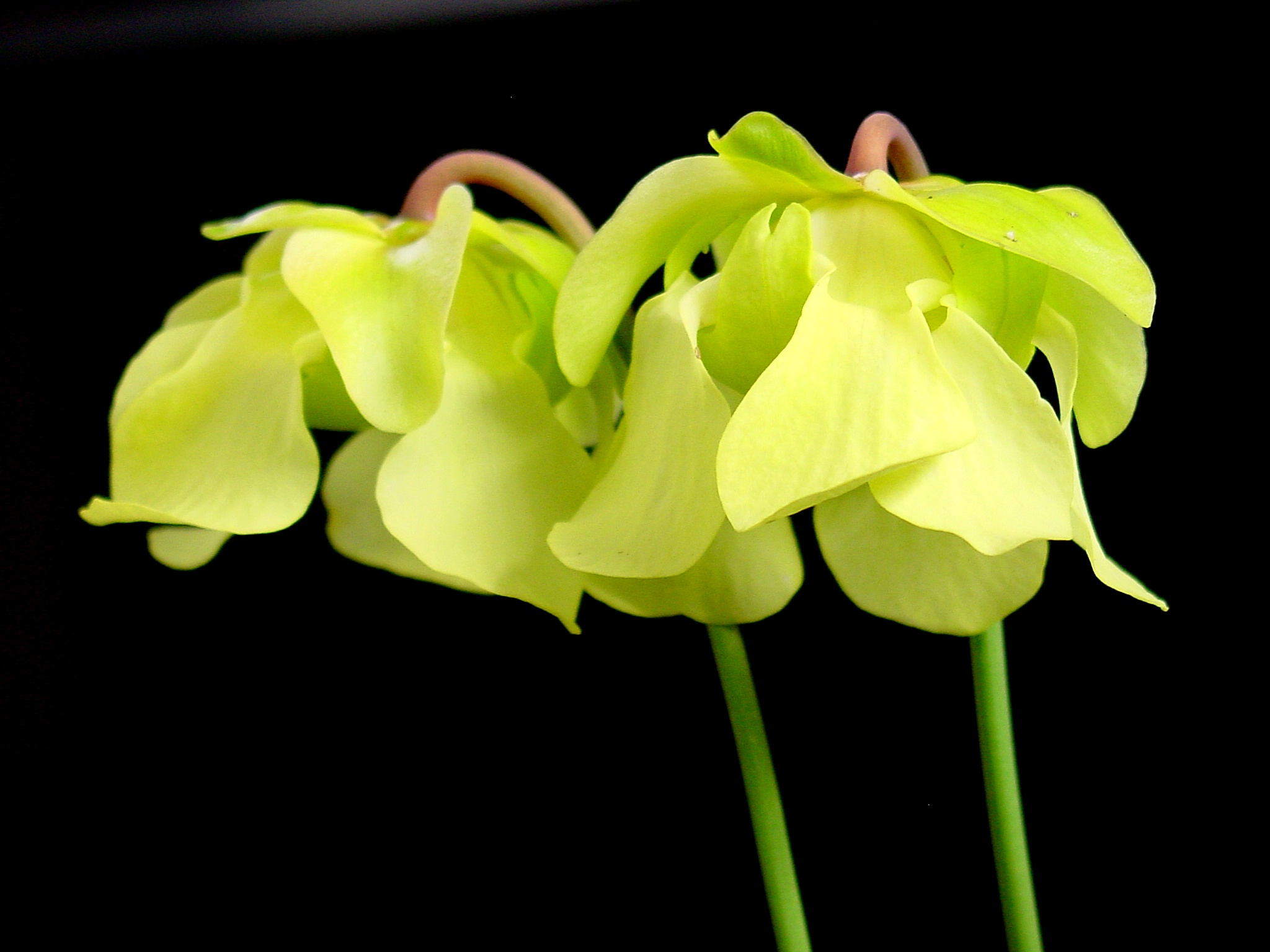
- Sarracenia alata flowers
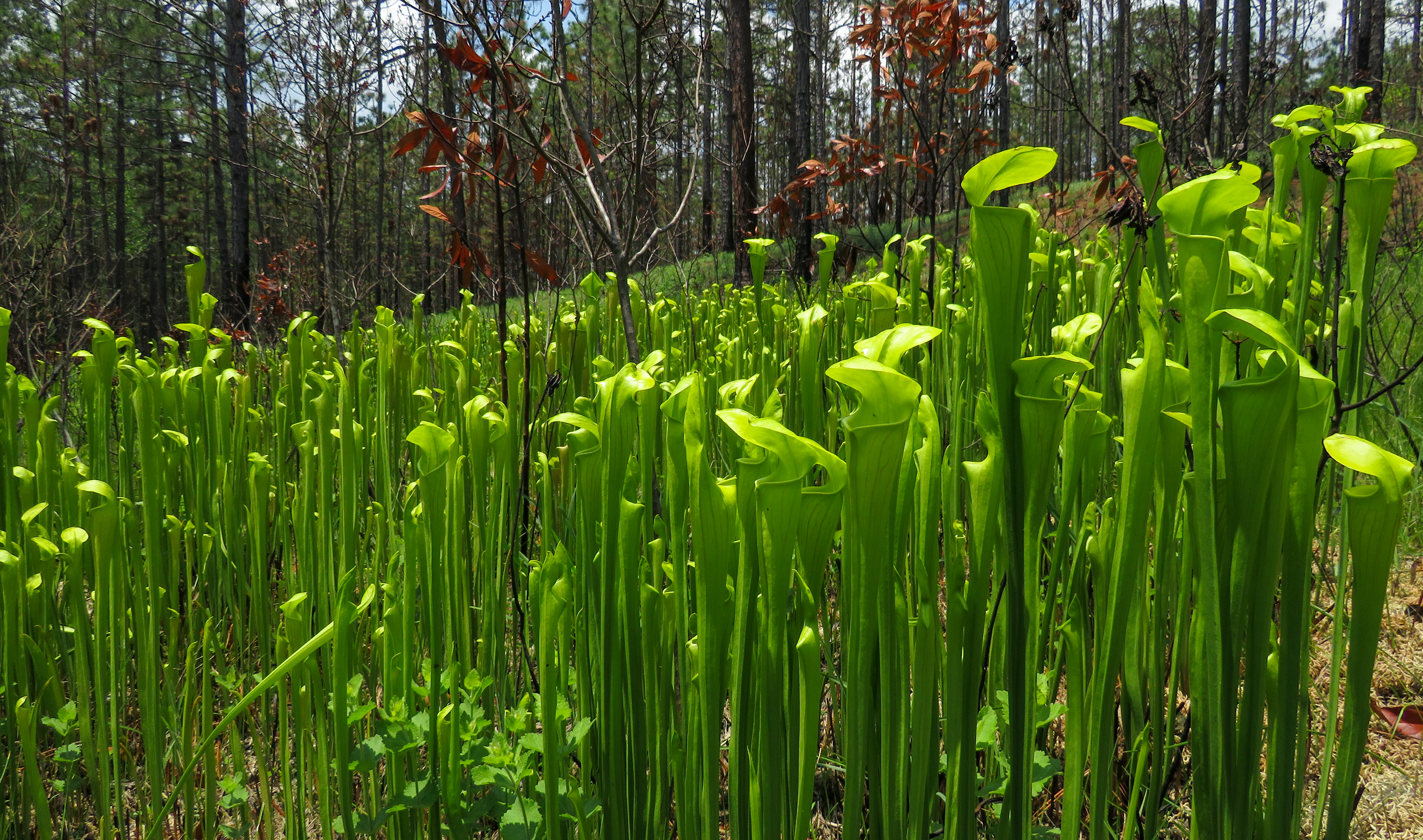
- S. alata pitchers emerging following a prescribed burn

Conservation status
- Near Threatened (IUCN 2.3)

- Apparently Secure (NatureServe)
- CITES Appendix II

Scientific classification
- Kingdom: Plantae
- Clade: Tracheophytes
- Clade: Angiosperms
- Clade: Eudicots
- Clade: Asterids
- Order: Ericales
- Family: Sarraceniaceae
- Genus: Sarracenia
- Species: S. alata

Binomial name
- Sarracenia alata (Alph. Wood) Alph. Wood
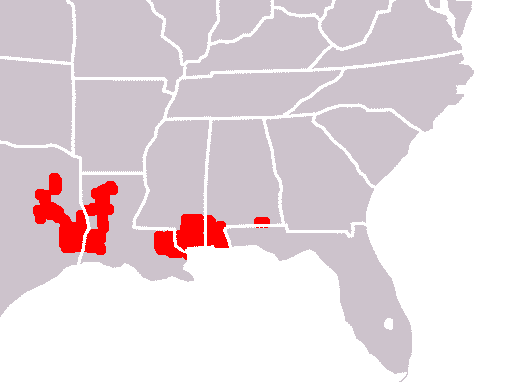
- Sarracenia alata range

Synonyms
- Sarracenia sledgei Macfarl.

= Sarracenia alata =

Species of carnivorous plant

Sarracenia alata, also known as yellow trumpets, pale pitcher plant or pale trumpet, is a carnivorous plant in the genus Sarracenia. Specifically, S. alata is an endemic species to North America; it is native to the southeastern regions of the United States, including parts of the Gulf Coast states.

== Distribution ==
Like all Sarracenia species, S. alata is endemic to the New World, having evolved its perennial growth habit and insect-supplementation as a result of its unique ecological niche and environment. These pitcher plants grow in generally flat and low-lying areas, preferring protection from heavy breezes and high winds. They thrive where most plants would likely perish—in consistently saturated soils that are generally low in nutrients—as well as open wetlands, typically classified as longleaf pine (Pinus palustris) savannas.

The pale pitcher plant's habitat is split into two geographically separate areas: an eastern range from East Louisiana across the Gulf Coastline of Mississippi, and into West Alabama. The species also has a western range from East Texas into West Louisiana. In Mississippi, there are mature, wild specimens of S. alata which rival the sheer size of any other Sarracenia species.

== Description ==
Among members of Sarracenia the floral coloring of Sarracenia alata is remarkably varied. Flowers may be cream to white, greenish, yellow or reddish. As the floral color variations exist within populations hundreds of miles from any other Sarracenia species, these variations cannot be attributed to hybridization. Other than the range of floral colors, Sarracenia alata differs little from Sarracenia rubra. The veining of Sarracenia rubra pitchers tends to be more reticulated whereas that of Sarracenia alata often exhibits more of a pinstripe pattern and grows taller pitchers.
