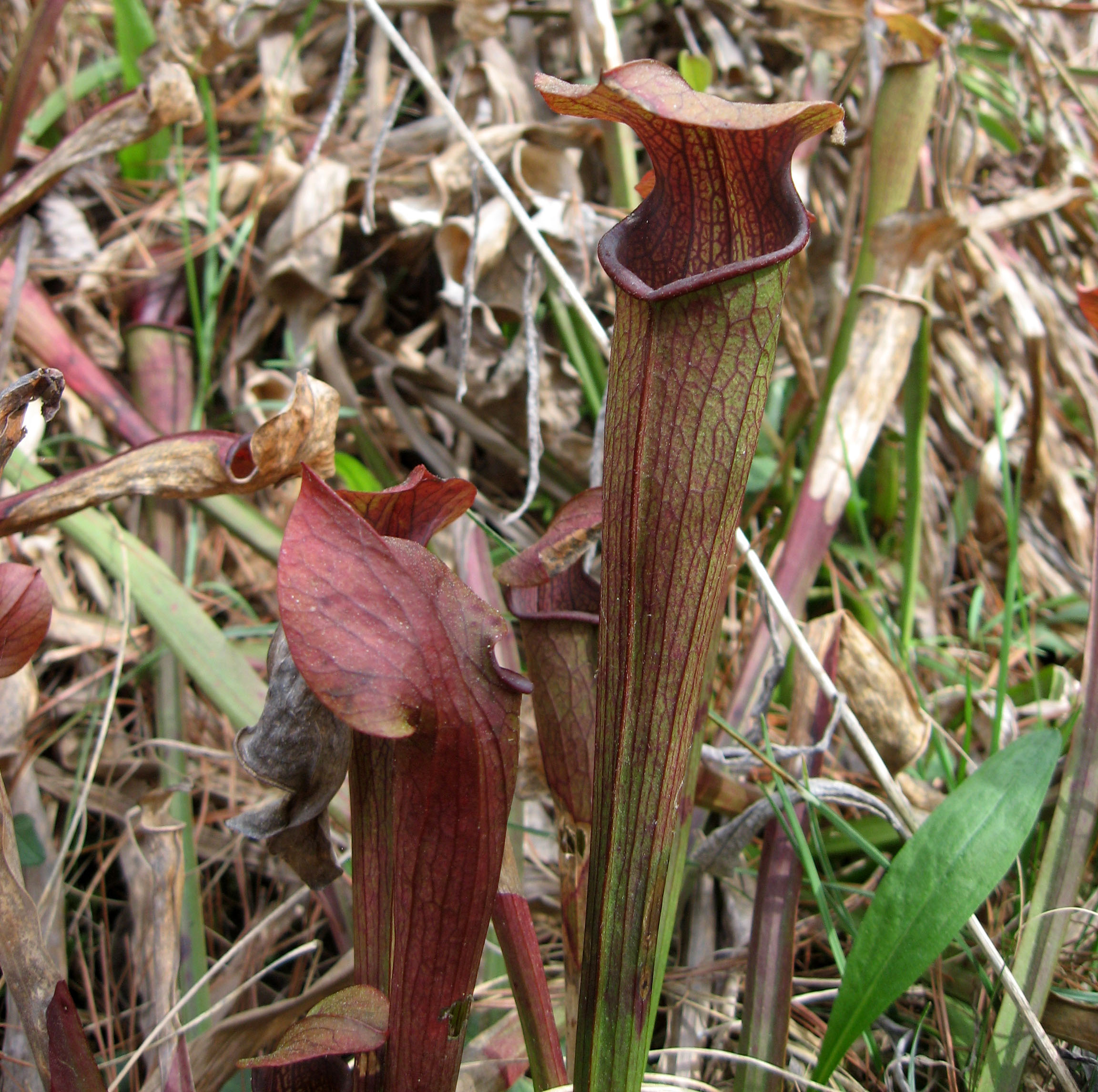

Conservation status
- Endangered (ESA)
- CITES Appendix I

Scientific classification
- Kingdom: Plantae
- Clade: Tracheophytes
- Clade: Angiosperms
- Clade: Eudicots
- Clade: Asterids
- Order: Ericales
- Family: Sarraceniaceae
- Genus: Sarracenia
- Species: S. jonesii

Binomial name
- Sarracenia jonesii Wherry
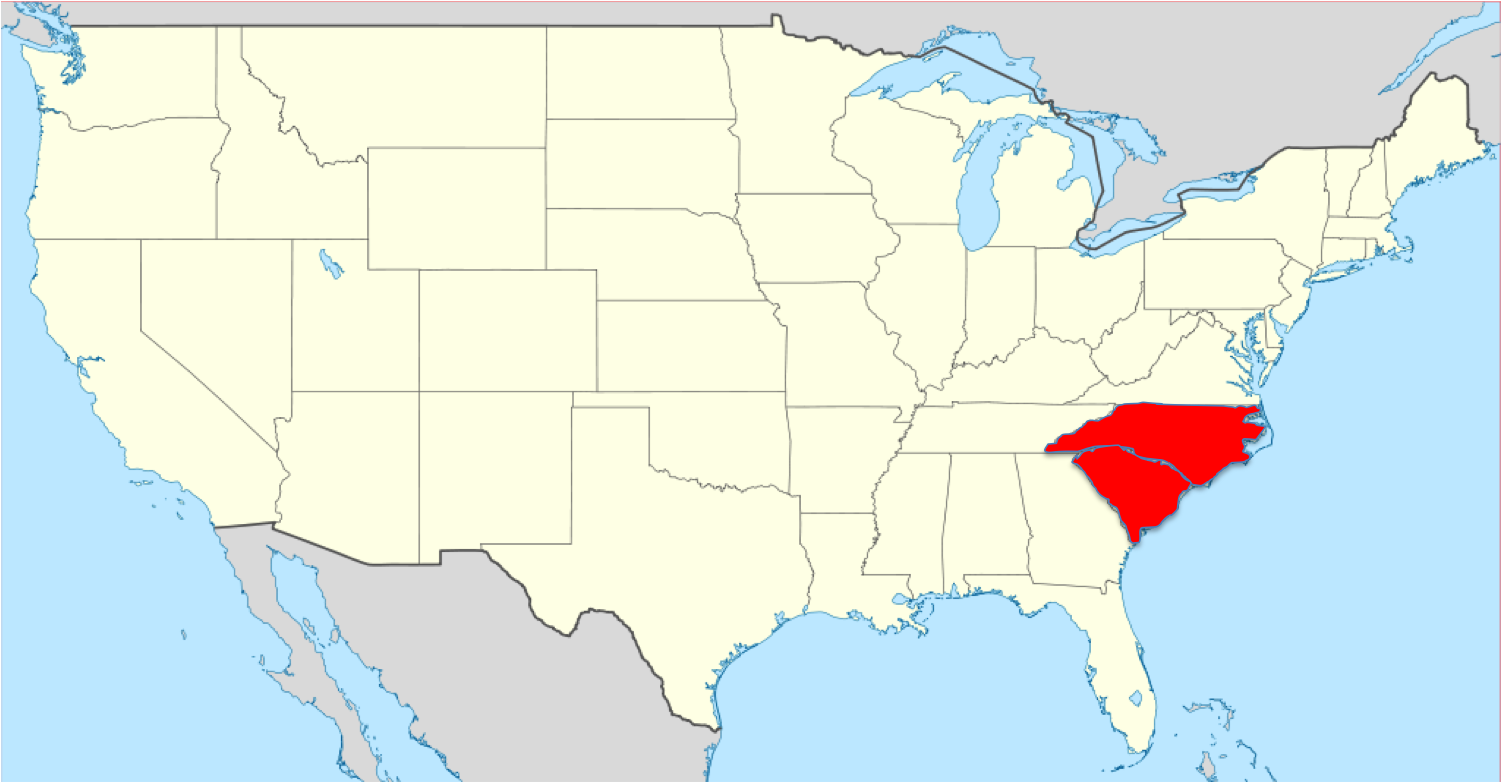
- Range of Sarracenia jonesii

Synonyms
- Sarracenia jonesii subsp. jonesii (Wherry) Wherry

= Sarracenia jonesii =

Jones' pitcher plant

Species of carnivorous plant

Sarracenia jonesii is a species of pitcher plant endemic to bogs in the Appalachian Mountains of North Carolina and South Carolina. It is currently only found in ten locations: 4 in North Carolina and 6 in South Carolina. It is known as a carnivorous plant because it attracts and traps insects. By drowning and digesting the insects, Sarracenia jonesii are able to absorb vital nutrients. The pitcher plant has hollow, tubular leaves that are designed to catch the insects. S. jonesii is listed as endangered by the US federal government.

== Description ==
Sarracenia jonesii has hollow tubular pitchers that are green in color with maroon veins. It is a stemless herbaceous perennial that requires full sunlight to grow. Flowers are usually maroon, 5-petaled and globular and produce a fragrant odor. The pitchers produced are narrow with a horizontal lid to prevent too much rain water from entering the tube. The pitcher attracts flies and other small insects to feed on it, luring them with colorful leaves and sweet smells. The sides of the pitcher are waxy and slippery, which prevents insects from escaping once trapped. The nectar paralyzes the insects and digestive fluids in the tubular leaf decompose the insect which allows the plant to then absorb nutrients. The plant ranges in height from 21 to 73 cm. The fragrant flowers are borne singly on erect scales from April to June, with seed set occurring in October.

== Distribution ==
Sarracenia jonesii is endemic to North Carolina and South Carolina. Sarracenia jonesii are usually found at lower elevations. It can be found in bogs in the mountainous region on the border of the two states. It favors depression bogs and cataract bogs. The soil that Sarracenia jonesii occupies is usually deep, highly acidic, and poorly drained.

== Conservation ==
Sarracenia jonesii was listed as an endangered species in the United States due to its extremely limited distribution and because of its vulnerability as a species. Sarracenia jonesii as well as other species of Sarracenia are often collected by enthusiastic plant collectors which furthers many of their statuses as endangered. The U.S. Fish and Wildlife Service has stated that 16 of the 26 previously known locations of S. jonesii have been extirpated from North Carolina and South Carolina. Sarracenia jonesii tend to occupy soil where nitrogen is not readily available to the plants. When conserving by replanting, it should be replanted into soil that is nutrient-poor.

In 2007, Meadowview Biological Research Station successfully reintroduced two populations of S. jonesii to its historic range in North Carolina to include the Biltmore Estate, under a National Fish and Wildlife Foundation Grant, and Falling Creek Camp for Boys. As of 2026, Sarracenia jonesii remains an endangered species.

Current threats to the pitcher plant are habitat loss, wildfires, and drought. Fertilizer and chemical runoff are also less serious threats. Climate change is a contributor to these threats because the boggy habitats they occupy are changing or moving.

== Taxonomy ==
The taxonomic status of S. jonesii has been widely debated in the past. It has been classified as a subspecies of S. rubra, although recent research suggests that it is its own species. The disjunct distribution from other species of S. rubra, differences morphologically, and unique coloration and fragrance from other subspecies of S. rubra suggest that it has adapted to suit different insects within its environment. Such changes constitute a speciation event, thus granting S. jonesii species status. Sarracenia jonesii was separated from the S. rubra complex by Case and Case, and isozyme studies conducted by Godt and Hamrick also support species status of S. jonesii.
