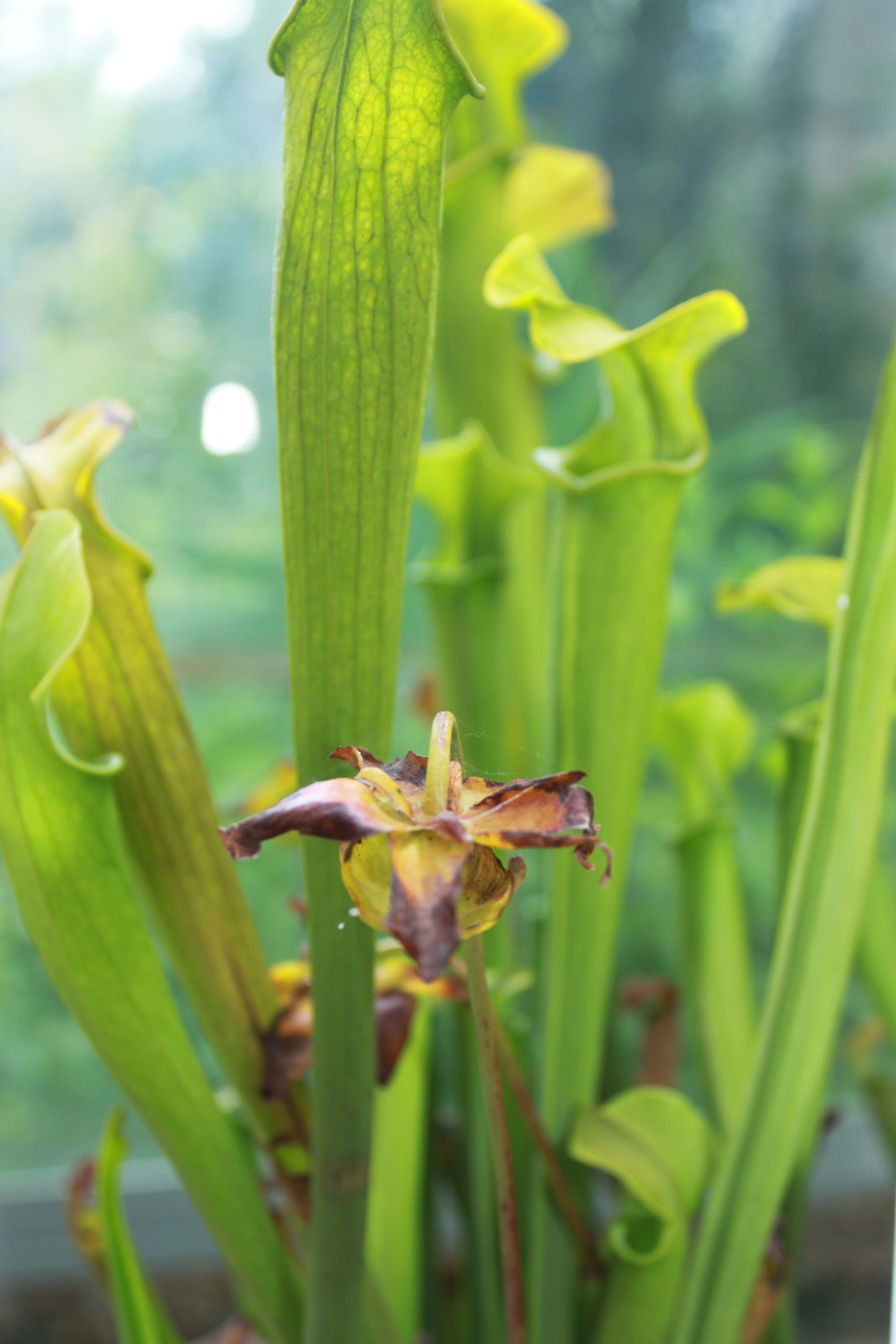

Conservation status
- Vulnerable (NatureServe)
- CITES Appendix I

Scientific classification
- Kingdom: Plantae
- Clade: Tracheophytes
- Clade: Angiosperms
- Clade: Eudicots
- Clade: Asterids
- Order: Ericales
- Family: Sarraceniaceae
- Genus: Sarracenia
- Species: S. alabamensis

Binomial name
- Sarracenia alabamensis Case & R.B.Case

Synonyms
- S. rubra subsp. alabamensis (Case and R.B.Case) D.E.Schnell .; S. rubra subsp. wherryi (Case and R.B.Case) D.E.Schnell .

= Sarracenia alabamensis =

Cane-brake pitcher plant

Species of carnivorous plant

Sarracenia alabamensis, also known as the cane-brake pitcher plant, is a carnivorous plant in the genus Sarracenia. Like all Sarracenia, it is native to the New World. S. alabamensis subsp. alabamensis is found only in central Alabama, while subsp. wherryi is found in southwestern Alabama, eastern Mississippi and Florida, all in the United States. It is sometimes treated as two subspecies of S. rubra.

== Morphology and carnivory ==
Like other members of the genus Sarracenia, S. alabamensis traps insects using a rolled leaf, which in this species is finely pubescent and between 20 cm and 65 cm tall. It also forms large clumps within a few years. The uppermost part of the leaf is flared into a lid (the operculum), which prevents excess rain from entering the pitcher and diluting the digestive secretions within. The upper regions of the pitcher are covered in short, stiff, downwards-pointing hairs, which serve to guide insects alighting on the upper portions of the leaf towards the opening of the pitcher tube. The opening of the pitcher tube is retroflexed into a 'nectar roll' or peristome, whose surface is studded with nectar-secreting glands. Prey entering the tube find that their footing is made extremely uncertain by the smooth, waxy secretions found on the surfaces of the upper portion of the tube. Insects losing their footing on this surface plummet to the bottom of the tube, where a combination of digestive fluid, wetting agents and inward-pointing hairs prevent their escape. Some large insects (such as wasps) have been reported to escape from the pitchers on occasion, by chewing their way out through the wall of the tube.

== Growth cycle ==
Sarracenia alabamensis begins spring by sending up crimson flowers, often several to a growth point. After petal-drop, the first pitchers of the season open. In S. alabamensis, the spring pitchers are weak and floppy, with a large wing. In summer and autumn, larger and more robust pitchers are formed. In subsp. alabamensis, pitchers are yellow-green with reddish veins, whereas in subsp. wherryi, they are shorter and often an olive green color. The plants go dormant in winter, sometimes dying right back to the rhizome in very cold weather.

== Conservation status ==
Fewer than 15 sites of S. alabamensis subsp. alabamensis remain due to habitat loss, drainage and poaching. It is listed on the US Endangered Species Act as well as Appendix I of CITES. Because of these there are major restrictions on selling plants across state lines in the USA, and trading internationally. S. alabamensis subsp. wherryi is less threatened due to its wider distribution but is still listed on Appendix II of CITES.

== Taxonomy and botanical history ==
Two subspecies are recognized:

- S. alabamensis subsp. alabamanensis Case & R.B.Case (Cane-brake pitcher plant)
- S. alabamensis subsp. wherryi (D.E.Schnell) Case & R.B.Case (Wherry's pitcher plant)

Variants of the latter include a regularly pigmented plant with yellow flower, and giant plants from Chatom, Alabama, known unofficially as "Chatom giant".

Sarracenia alabamensis was first collected in Elmore County, Alabama by Frederick Case & Roberta Burckhardt Case in June 1971. They published the new species in 1975, but neglected to indicate a holotype and included specimens in the type collection that were gathered on different days. This makes the publication of the species invalid (nom. inval.) according to the International Code for Botanical Nomenclature. Frederick and Roberta Case then published the new subspecies S. alabamensis subsp. wherryi in 1976, but this too was invalid since S. alabamensis remained invalidly published. In 1977 Donald E. Schnell disagreed with species rank given to S. alabamensis and reduced it to a subspecies of S. rubra, moving subsp. wherryi to subspecific status under S. rubra in 1978. These publications were also invalid because the basionyms the new combinations were based on were still invalidly published. To complicate matters further, Schnell published S. rubra subsp. wherryi in 1978 as a new subspecies (subsp. nov.) instead of a new combination involving the previous publication of S. alabamensis subsp. wherryi published two years earlier, though reference was made to it. Frederick and Roberta Case finally cleaned up the mess by validly publishing S. alabamensis and S. alabamensis subsp. wherryi in 2005. Sarracenia alabamensis subsp. alabamensis remains a valid autonym since the 2005 publication.
