= Sarracenia × swaniana =

Scientific classification
- Kingdom: Plantae
- Clade: Tracheophytes
- Clade: Angiosperms
- Clade: Eudicots
- Clade: Asterids
- Order: Ericales
- Family: Sarraceniaceae
- Genus: Sarracenia
- Species: S. × swaniana

Binomial name
- Sarracenia × swaniana hort. ex G.Nicholson

Species of carnivorous plant

Sarracenia × swaniana is a nothospecies of carnivorous plant from the genus Sarracenia in the family Sarraceniaceae described by hort. and Nichols. It is a hybrid between Sarracenia purpurea subsp. venosa and Sarracenia minor var. minor.
