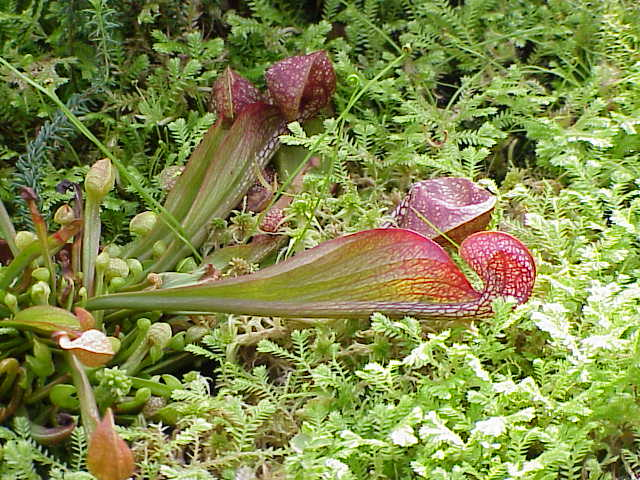

Conservation status
- Least Concern (IUCN 2.3)

- Apparently Secure (NatureServe)
- CITES Appendix II

Scientific classification
- Kingdom: Plantae
- Clade: Tracheophytes
- Clade: Angiosperms
- Clade: Eudicots
- Clade: Asterids
- Order: Ericales
- Family: Sarraceniaceae
- Genus: Sarracenia
- Species: S. psittacina

Binomial name
- Sarracenia psittacina Michx. (1803)
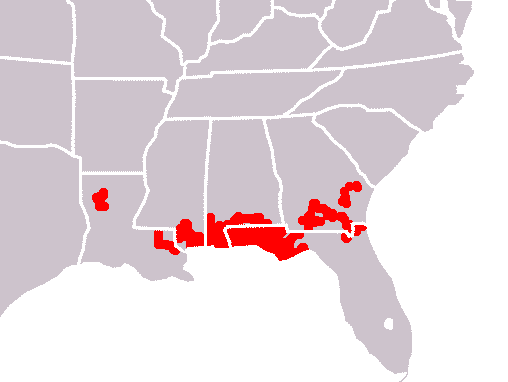
- Sarracenia psittacina range

Synonyms
- Sarracenia calceolata Nutt. (1834); Sarracenia pulchella Croom (1834); Sarracenia rubra auct. non Walt.: Steud. (1821)

= Sarracenia psittacina =

Parrot pitcher plant

Species of carnivorous plant

Sarracenia psittacina, also known as the parrot pitcherplant, is a carnivorous plant in the genus Sarracenia. Like all the Sarracenia, it is native to North America, in the Southeastern United States.

Sarracenia psittacina employs the same trapping mechanism as Darlingtonia californica, using a small entrance in the pitcher mouth, which prey goes through in search of more nectar that was produced by the plant on the rim of the pitcher mouth. The prey is then confused by light shining through what appear to be false exits (or "windows") and crawls toward the brighter area down into the pitcher. Criss-crossed downward-facing hairs densely line the interior of the pitcher, forcing the prey further into the pitcher to an area where digestive enzymes such as proteases are prevalent in the liquid.

This species is frequently submerged in its native habitat and will capture water arthropods and tadpoles, for example, while submerged.

== Infraspecific taxa ==
- Sarracenia psittacina f. heterophylla J. & J.Ainsworth (1996) nom.nud.
- Sarracenia psittacina var. minor Hook. (1834)
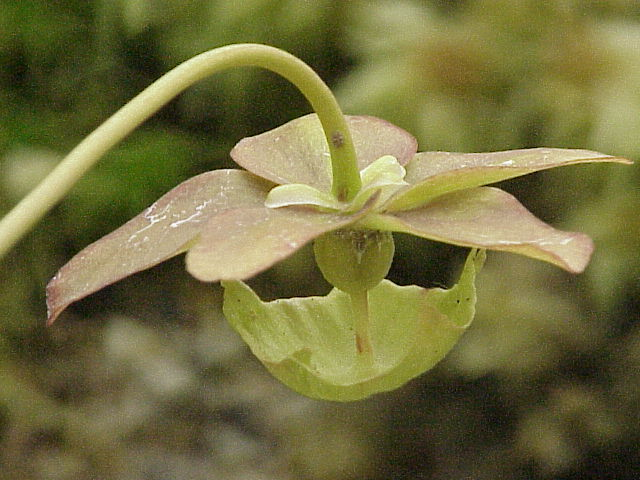
Sarracenia psittacina flower

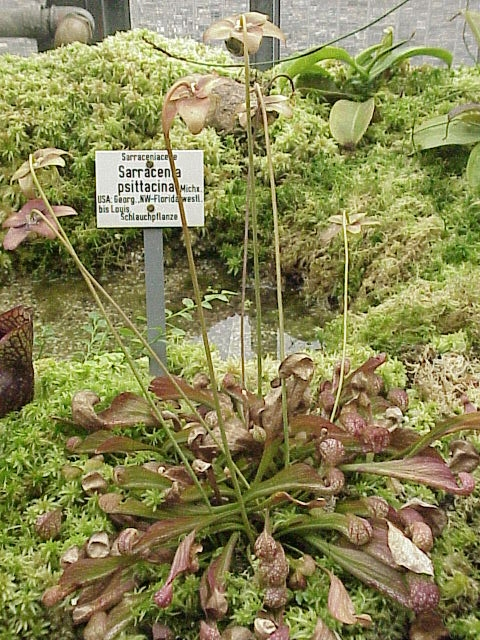
Sarracenia psittacina

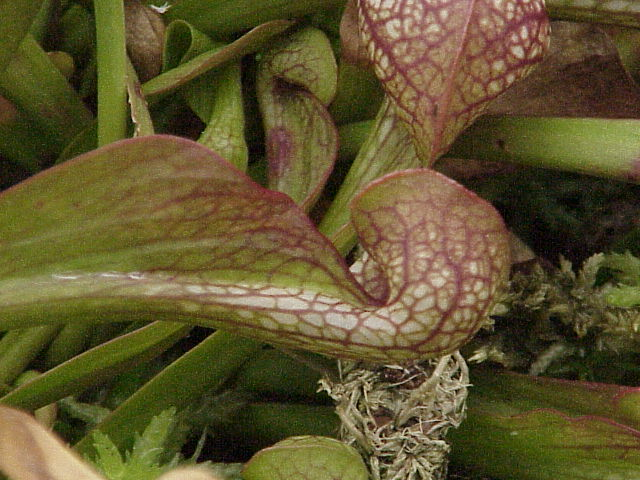
Sarracenia psittacina

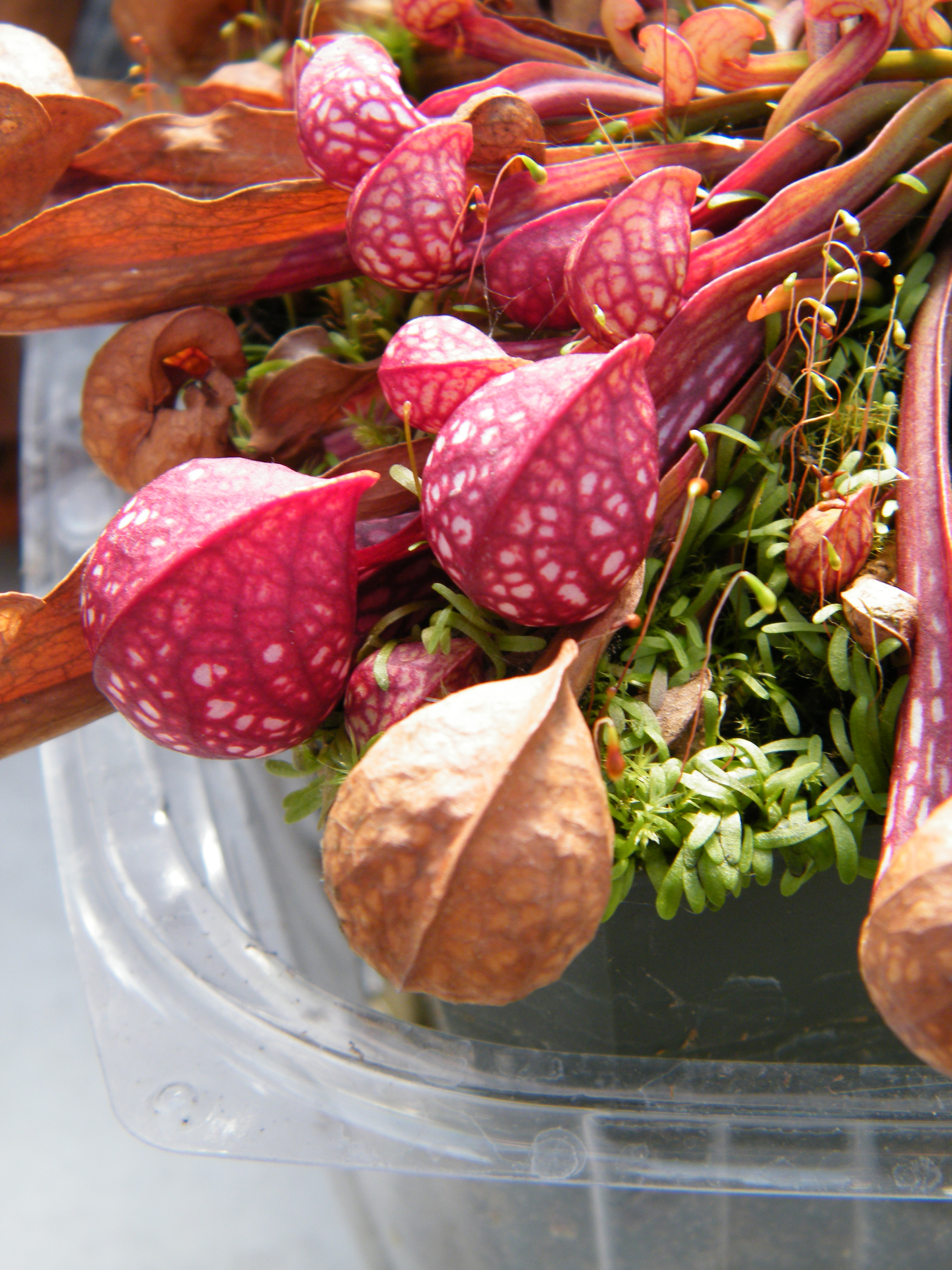
