= North American Sarracenia Conservancy =

American non-profit organization

- Type: 501(c)(3)
- Website: nasarracenia.org

The North American Sarracenia Conservancy (NASC) is a 501(c)(3) non-profit organization dedicated to habitat conservation. Founded in 2005, the Conservancy was granted tax-exempt status in January 2009. The main focus of the Conservancy is the conservation and preservation of the natural habitats and genetic diversity of the Sarracenia pitcher plants. Sarracenia is a genus of carnivorous plant that trap prey in tube-shaped, hollow leaves, which in some species hold rain water. Species range from the southeastern United States, up the coastal plain, and into the Great Lakes and Canada. Within their range the plants naturally occur in sphagnum bogs, swamps, fens, and flooded plains.

== Conservation work ==
The NASC is one of several organizations working to protect the habitat of carnivorous plants in the wild. Other groups that are involved in such habitat conservation efforts include the International Carnivorous Plant Society, the Atlanta Botanical Garden, the Center for Plant Conservation at the Missouri Botanical Garden, the Carnivorous Plant Society. Of these, the NASC is the only one that specializes in Sarracenia (although many other organisms benefit from the conservation of Sarracenia habitat).
