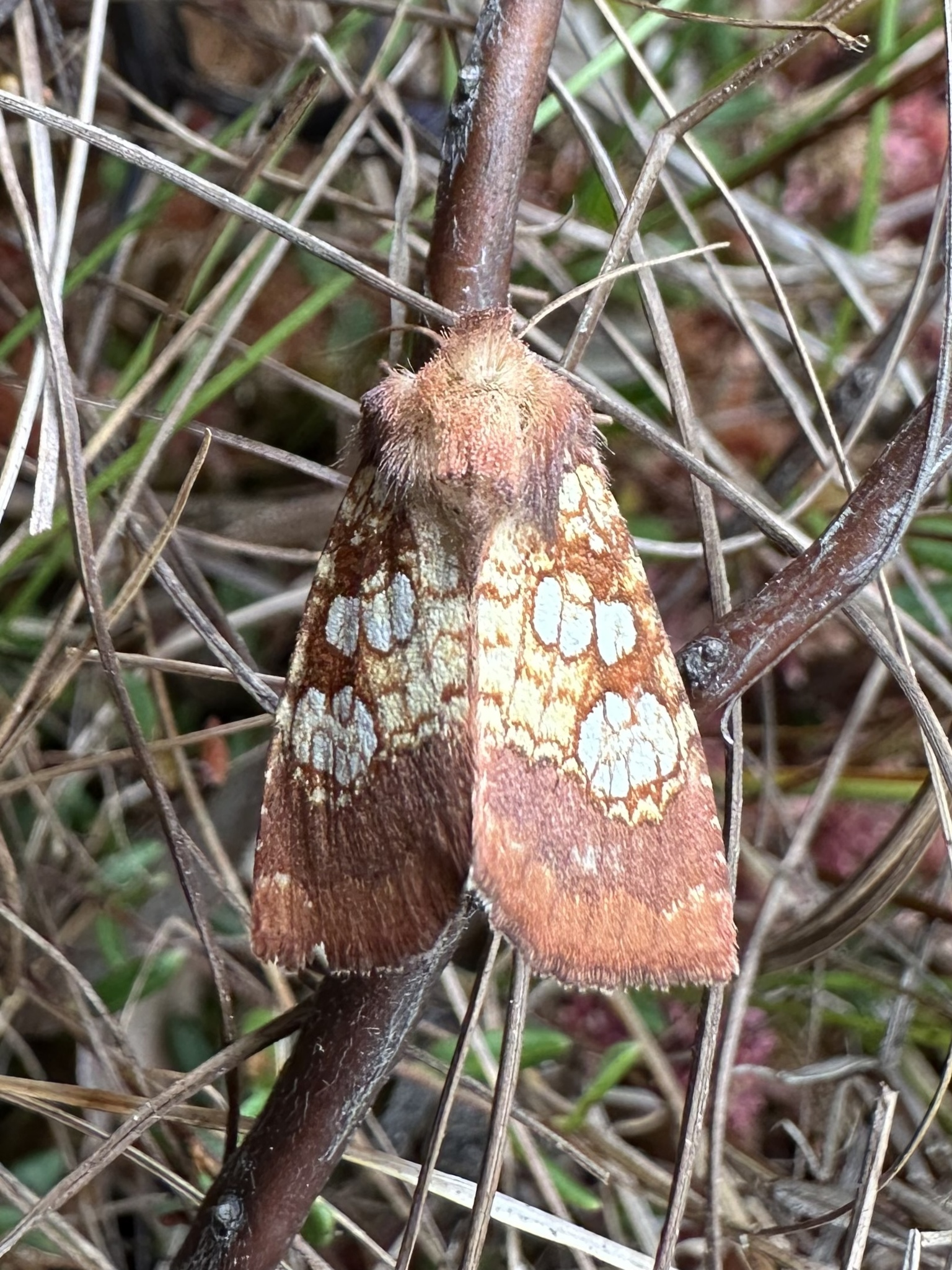

Scientific classification
- Kingdom: Animalia
- Phylum: Arthropoda
- Class: Insecta
- Order: Lepidoptera
- Superfamily: Noctuoidea
- Family: Noctuidae
- Genus: Papaipema
- Species: P. appassionata

Binomial name
- Papaipema appassionata (Harvey, 1876)

Synonyms
- Gortyna appassionata Harvey, 1876; Papaipema horni Strand, 1915

= Papaipema appassionata =

Species of moth

Papaipema appassionata, the pitcher plant borer, is a species of moth described by Leon F. Harvey in 1876. It is native to North America, where it has been recorded from Florida, Maine, Maryland, Massachusetts, Michigan, Minnesota, New Brunswick, Quebec, Rhode Island, South Carolina and Wisconsin. It is listed as threatened in the US state of Connecticut.

The wingspan is about 30–41 mm (1.2–1.6 in)

It uses the roots of Sarracenia species (including Sarracenia purpurea) as its host plant.

== Gallery ==
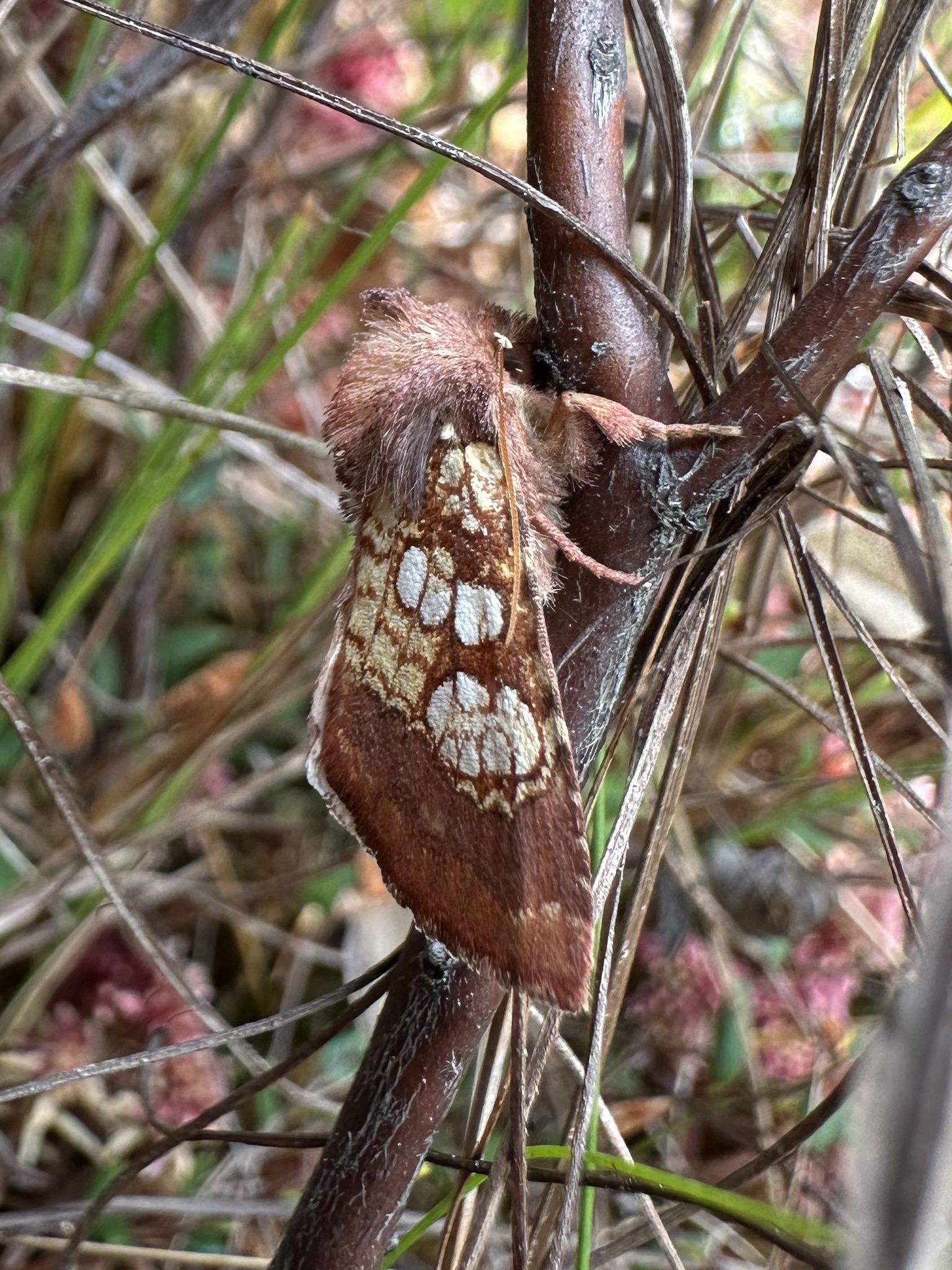
Adult

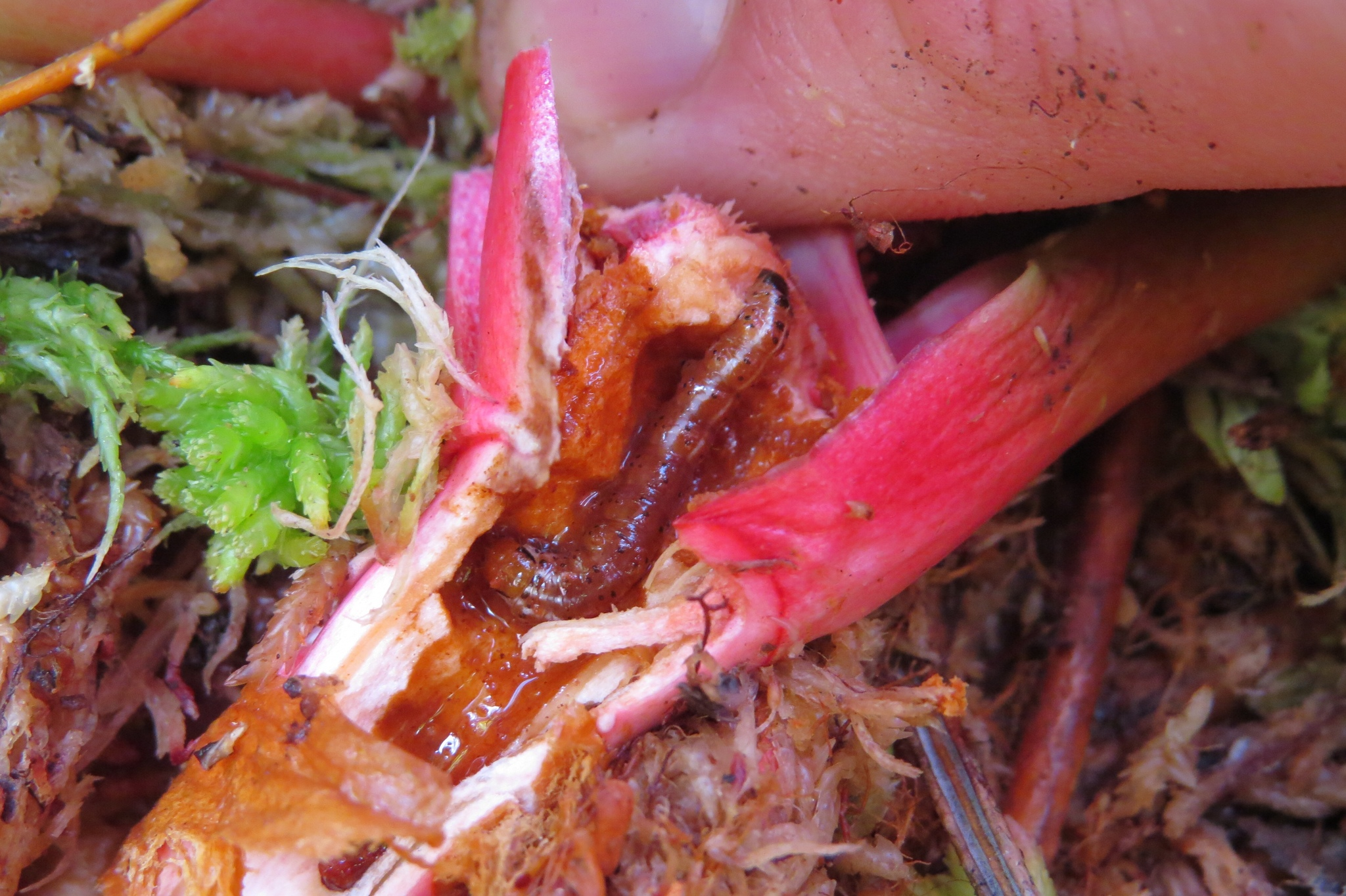
Larva feeding on Sarracenia purpurea
