= Cataract bog =

Type of wetland

A cataract bog is a rare ecological community formed where a permanent stream flows over a granite outcropping. The sheeting of water keeps the edges of the rock wet without eroding the soil; in this precarious location no tree or large shrub can maintain a roothold. The result is a narrow, permanently wet, sunny habitat.

While a cataract bog is host to plants typical of a bog, it is technically a fen. Bogs get water from the atmosphere, while fens get their water from groundwater seepage.

Cataract bogs inhabit a narrow, linear zone next to the stream and are partly shaded by trees and shrubs in the adjacent plant communities. Algae growing on the rocks can make the surface slippery and dangerous for those exploring a cataract bog.

== Typical species ==
The rushing water carves out small depressions where soil accumulates, forming micro-islands that play host to plants that thrive with low levels of nutrients and shallow root structures. Typical species include Sphagnum moss; carnivorous plants such as round-leaf sundew (Drosera rotundifolia), pitcher plants (Sarracenia purpurea and S. jonesii), and horned bladderwort (Utricularia cornuta); several orchid species such as common grass pink (Calopogon tuberosus), small green wood-orchid (Platanthera clavellata), rose pogonia (Pogonia ophioglossoides), and nodding ladies'-tresses (Spiranthes cernua). Other plants found in cataract bogs are limeseep grass-of-Parnassus (Parnassia grandifolia), Indian paint brush (Castilleja coccinea), stiff cowbane (Oxypolis rigidior), Appalachian bluet (Houstonia serpyllifolia) and northern sundrops (Oenothera tetragona).

The plant communities are fragile because of their tenuous attachment to thin soil above the rock substrate. During prolonged drought, the stream may dry up and the edges of the micro-islands curl up. Heavy rainfall can then wash away the micro-islands, so a cataract bog is in a continual state of change and renewal.

== Location ==
Cataract bogs are found only in the southern Appalachian Mountains of the United States, at elevations of between 1,200 and 2,400 feet (370 and 730 m). They are restricted to the Blue Ridge Escarpment region of South Carolina and a small area of North Carolina, a region with exceptionally high rainfall.
