= Meadowview Biological Research Station =

- Formation: 1995; 31 years ago
- Type: Nonprofit
- Tax ID no.: 54-1904513
- Legal status: 501(c)(3)
- Headquarters: Woodford, Virginia
- Board President: Dr. Phil Sheridan
- Website: https://pitcherplant.org/

Meadowview Biological Research Station is a non-profit 501(c)(3) organization dedicated to preserving and restoring rare wetland plants, habitats and associated ecosystems on the coastal plain of Maryland and Virginia. It was created in 1995 with the specific goal of restoring the rare yellow pitcher plant (Sarracenia flava), the purple pitcher plant (Sarracenia purpurea), and associate species to pitcher plant bogs or seepage wetlands in their historic ranges.

Most pitcher plant habitats have been destroyed in this critical mid-Atlantic region to the point where less than 100 yellow pitchers plants were left in just two natural sites in southern Virginia by 2007. Meadowview worked to deal with, and reverse, the process of extirpation of local and regional pitcher plants habitats, flora, and fauna.

== Accomplishments ==
Meadowview has had a number of notable accomplishments in conservation efforts of pitcher plants and associate species.

- Meadowview has successfully purchased a 101-acre (0.41 km^{2}) preserve in southern Virginia called the Joseph Pines Preserve, which is dedicated to preserving the native Virginia longleaf pine/pitcher plant ecosystem. A total of 18 indigenous, rare plant species are being reintroduced on the property as part of an integrated ecosystem restoration. To date Meadowview has protected a total of six native Virginia yellow pitcher plant populations on its preserve (4 having been extirpated in the past ten years). The group also aims to capture the entire native Virginia longleaf pine germplasm on this property.
- Meadowview has expanded Joseph Pines Preserve by an additional 131 acres (0.53 km^{2}) as of June 2012
- Meadowview has added a new Biodiversity Education Center to the preserve with an additional 1.5 acres (0.0061 km^{2}), bringing the total land to 233.5 acres (0.945 km^{2}) as of September 2014
- Meadowview has also reintroduced two populations of the federally endangered mountain sweet pitcher plant (Sarracenia jonesii) to its historic range in North Carolina to include the Biltmore Estate, under a National Fish and Wildlife Foundation Grant, and Falling Creek Camp for Boys.
