= International Carnivorous Plant Society =

- Type: 501(c)(3) non-profit organization
- Region served: Global
- Website: www.carnivorousplants.org

The International Carnivorous Plant Society (ICPS) is a non-profit organization founded in 1972. It is the International Cultivar Registration Authority for carnivorous plants. As of June 2011, the society had around 1400 members. The ICPS publishes a quarterly publication, the Carnivorous Plant Newsletter.

== Conservation efforts ==
The ICPS has set up the Nepenthes clipeata Survival Project (NcSP) to facilitate ex situ conservation of this species. With only an estimated 15 plants remaining in the wild as of 1995, Nepenthes clipeata is the most endangered of all known tropical pitcher plants. It is estimated that there are only three or four genetically-distinct lines of "white market" (legally collected) plants in cultivation.

The ICPS partially funded the establishment of The Rare Nepenthes Collection, which aims to conserve four of the rarest Nepenthes species: N. aristolochioides, N. clipeata, N. khasiana, and N. rigidifolia.

== See also ==
- North American Sarracenia Conservancy
