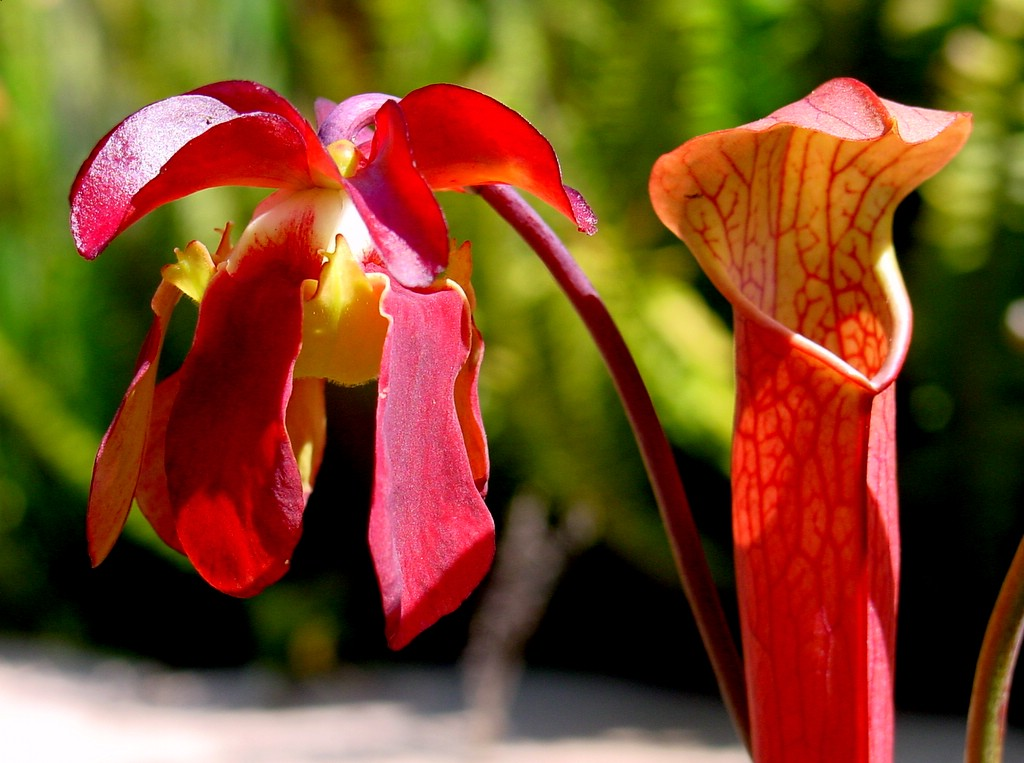
- Sarracenia rubra ssp. gulfensis (flower on left)

Conservation status
- Vulnerable (NatureServe)
- CITES Appendix II

Scientific classification
- Kingdom: Plantae
- Clade: Tracheophytes
- Clade: Angiosperms
- Clade: Eudicots
- Clade: Asterids
- Order: Ericales
- Family: Sarraceniaceae
- Genus: Sarracenia
- Species: S. rubra

Binomial name
- Sarracenia rubra Walter
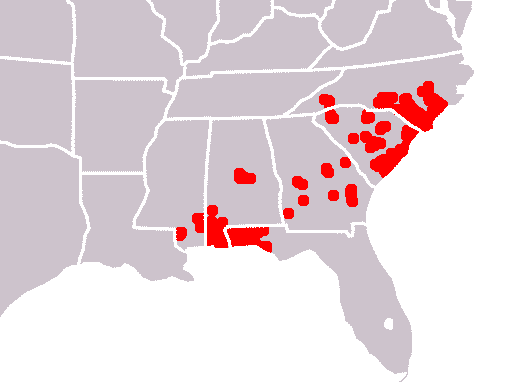
- Sarracenia rubra range

= Sarracenia rubra =

Species of carnivorous plant

Sarracenia rubra, also known as the sweet or purple pitcher plant, is a carnivorous plant in the genus Sarracenia. Like all Sarracenia, it is native to the New World. Its range extends from southern Mississippi, through southern Alabama, the Florida panhandle and Georgia, to the coastal plains of North Carolina and South Carolina.

== Morphology and carnivory ==
Like other members of the genus Sarracenia, the sweet pitcherplant traps insects using a rolled leaf, which in this species is generally smaller and narrower than most species, usually not exceeding 65 cm (26 inches) in height. Sarracenia rubra is generally clump-forming. The uppermost part of the leaf is flared into a lid (the operculum), which prevents excess rain from entering the pitcher and diluting the digestive secretions within. The upper regions of the pitcher are covered in short, stiff, downwards-pointing hairs, which serve to guide insects alighting on the upper portions of the leaf towards the opening of the pitcher tube. The opening of the pitcher tube is retroflexed into a 'nectar roll' or peristome, whose surface is studded with nectar-secreting glands. Prey entering the tube find that their footing is made extremely uncertain by the smooth, waxy secretions found on the surfaces of the upper portion of the tube. Insects losing their footing on this surface plummet to the bottom of the tube, where a combination of digestive fluid, wetting agents and inward-pointing hairs prevent their escape. Some large insects (such as wasps) have been reported to escape from the pitchers on occasion, by chewing their way out through the wall of the tube.

== Flowers ==
See also the section on Sarracenia flowers in the main article.

In spring, the plant produces small, bright red flowers with five-fold symmetry. The red petals are long and strap-like, and dangle over the umbrella-like style of the flower, which is held upside down at the end of a 50 cm long scape. The stigmata of the flower are found at the tips of the 'spokes' of this umbrella. Pollinating insects generally enter the flower from above, forcing their way into the cavity between the petals and umbrella, and depositing any pollen they are carrying on the stigmata as they enter. The pollinators generally exit the flower, having been dusted with the plant's own pollen, by lifting a petal. This one-way system helps to ensure cross pollination. Sarracenia rubra flowers are generally sweet-scented, hence the common name.

== Growth cycle ==
This species is characterised by producing quite floppy pitchers in spring with large wings, perhaps as a method of producing a large surface area of tissue in order to rapidly photosynthesise at the start of the year. Later on in summer and autumn, much more substantial pitchers are produced.

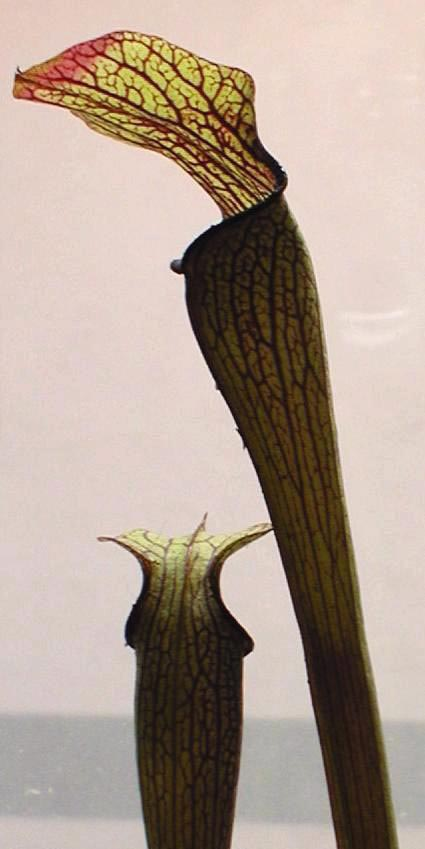
S. rubra ssp. jonesii

== Taxonomy ==
Sarracenia rubra taxonomy is rather complicated and still much debated. Currently, there are six subspecies:

- S. rubra subsp. rubra – the sweet, red-flowered pitcher-plant
- S. rubra subsp. jonesii [=S. jonesii] – the mountain sweet pitcherplant, federally protected as an endangered species
- S. rubra subsp. gulfensis – the Gulf sweet pitcher plant
- S. rubra subsp. viatorum – the ancestral pitcherplant
- S. rubra subsp. alabamensis [=S. alabamensis] – the Alabama canebrake pitcher plant, federally protected as an endangered species
- S. rubra subsp. wherryi [=S. alabamensis subsp. wherryi] – Wherry's sweet pitcher plant

These placings are somewhat disputed, however, as each could arguably be its own species due to differences in pitcher morphology. The similarity between the flowers of these taxa indicates a close relationship, however.
