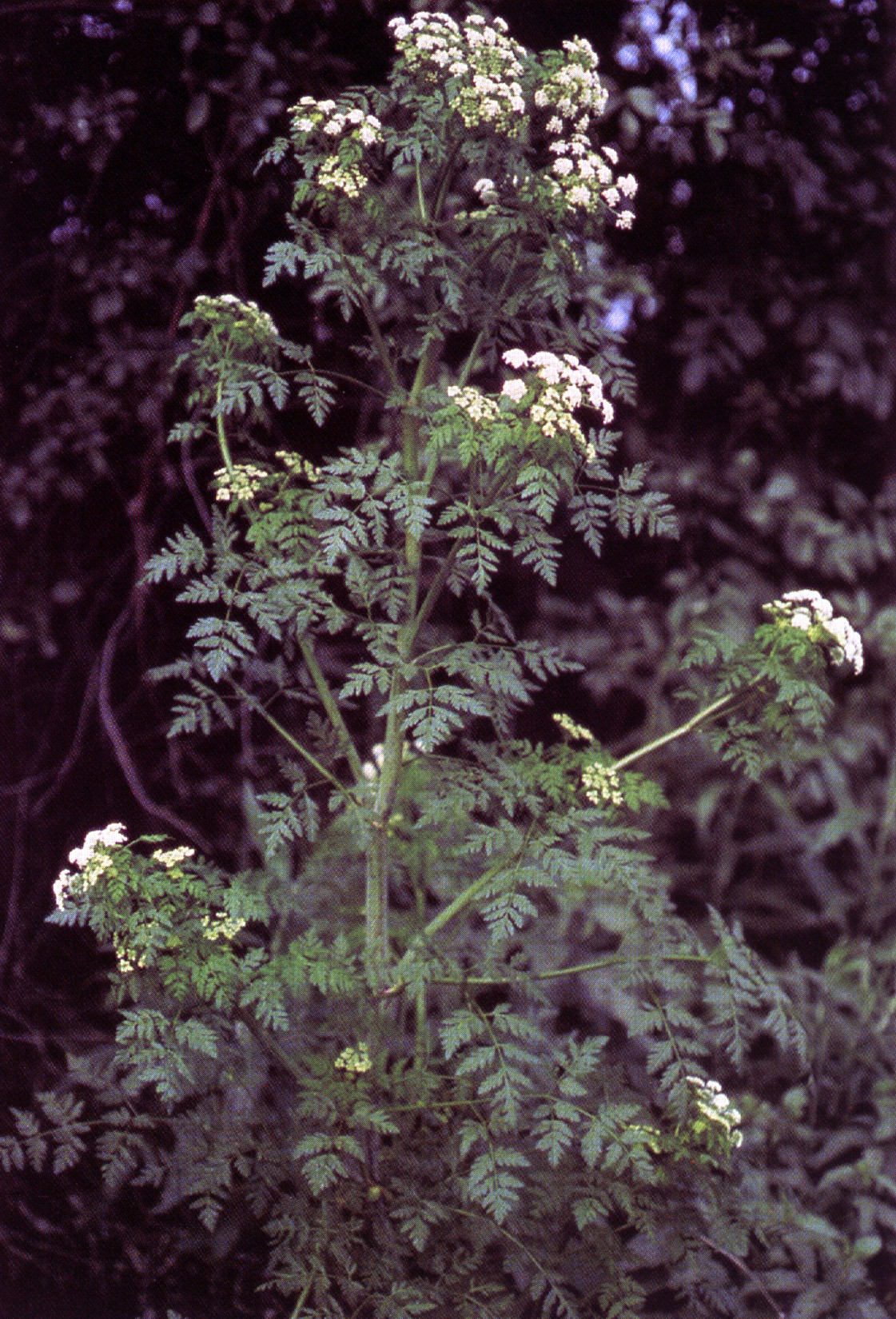

Conservation status
- Secure (NatureServe)

Scientific classification
- Kingdom: Plantae
- Clade: Tracheophytes
- Clade: Angiosperms
- Clade: Eudicots
- Clade: Asterids
- Order: Apiales
- Family: Apiaceae
- Genus: Conium
- Species: C. maculatum

Binomial name
- Conium maculatum L.

Synonyms
- List: Cicuta major; Cicuta officinalis; Conium ceretanum; Conium cicuta; Conium croaticum; Conium leiocarpum; Conium maculosum; Conium nodosum; Conium pyrenaicum; Conium sibiricum; Conium strictum; Conium tenuifolium; Coriandrum cicuta; Coriandrum maculatum; Selinum conium; Sium conium

= Conium maculatum =

Poisonous plant

Conium maculatum, commonly known as hemlock (British English) or poison hemlock (in North America), is a highly poisonous flowering plant and a nitrophile weed species in the carrot family Apiaceae.

The plant is herbaceous, with no woody parts, and has a biennial lifecycle. Under the right conditions, the plant grows quite rapidly during the growing season and can reach heights of 2.4 metres (8 feet) with a long penetrating root. The plant has a distinctive odour that is usually considered unpleasant and carries with the wind. The hollow stems are usually spotted dark maroon and turn dry and brown after the plant completes its biennial lifecycle.

Native to Europe and North Africa, hemlock is a hardy plant that can live in a variety of environments. It is widely naturalised outside its native range, including in Australia, West Asia, and North and South America, where it can become an invasive weed.

All parts of the plant are toxic, particularly the seeds and roots, and especially when ingested. Hemlock is well-known as the poison that killed the philosopher Socrates after his trial in Ancient Greece.

== Description ==
Conium maculatum is a herbaceous flowering plant that typically grows as a biennial, but can grow as a perennial on occasion. It is a nitrophile. The second year stems topped with flowers grow to between 0.5 and 3 m (1.6 and 9.8 ft) in height; they are coarse and branch frequently. Stems are hollow except at the joints where the leaves are attached and are generally spotted or streaked with purple. In the first year of growth, the plant has no stems and produces a large rosette of leaves. All parts of the plant are glabrous, lacking hairs, but sometimes they will have a small amount of blue-grey natural waxes on lower parts of the plant. The taproot is long, white, has a fleshy texture, and is usually unbranched.

The leaves are one- to three-pinnate, finely divided and lacy. The leaves lower down on the plant are two-pinnate or more, while the upper leaves are one-pinnate and often only partly divided. The lower leaves are larger than those higher up. They are broad with an overall triangular shape, some 30 to 60 cm (12 to 24 in) in length. The leaflets are attached in pairs on opposite sides of the central veins.

The poison hemlock's flowers are small and white; each flower has five petals and lacks sepals. The flowers have white stamens and a style that measures about 0.5 mm. The flowers are in umbrella shaped clusters called umbels. They measure 2 to 5 cm (0.8 to 2.0 in) in diameter and are found both at the end of stem branches and growing from the axils, the angle created where the leaf stem joins the main stems of the plant. Each umbel is a circular cluster of ten to twenty rays, the short stems 1 to 3.5 cm long, radiating out from its center.

The fruit is a schizocarp, it can easily be separated into two parts. The fruits measure 2.5 to 3.5 mm long and are gray-brown with ridges and have an egg shaped outline.

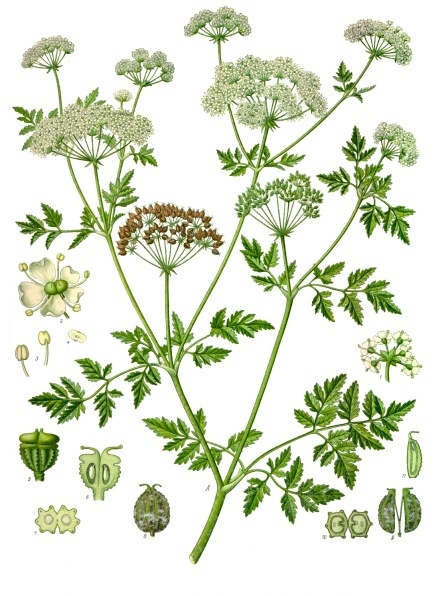
19th-century illustration

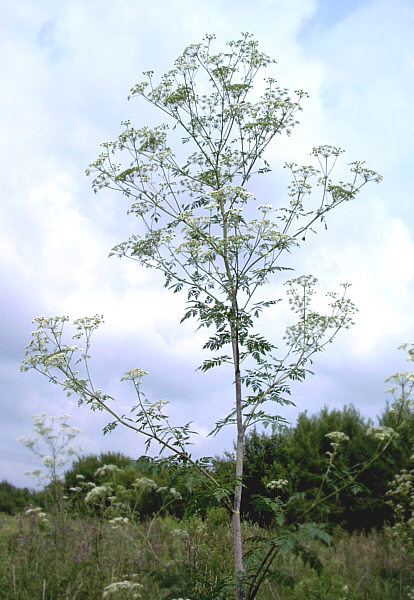
Habit

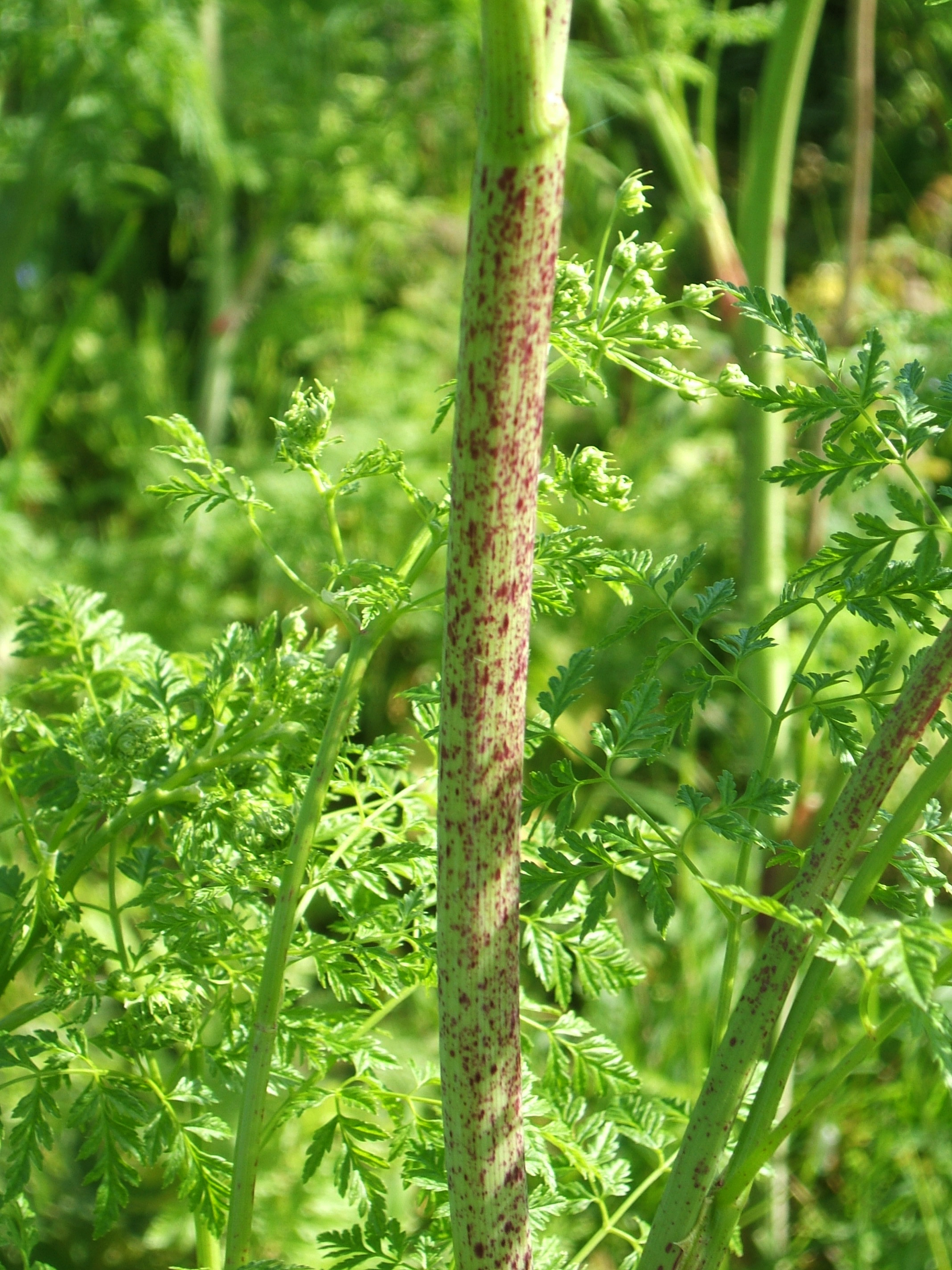
Stem

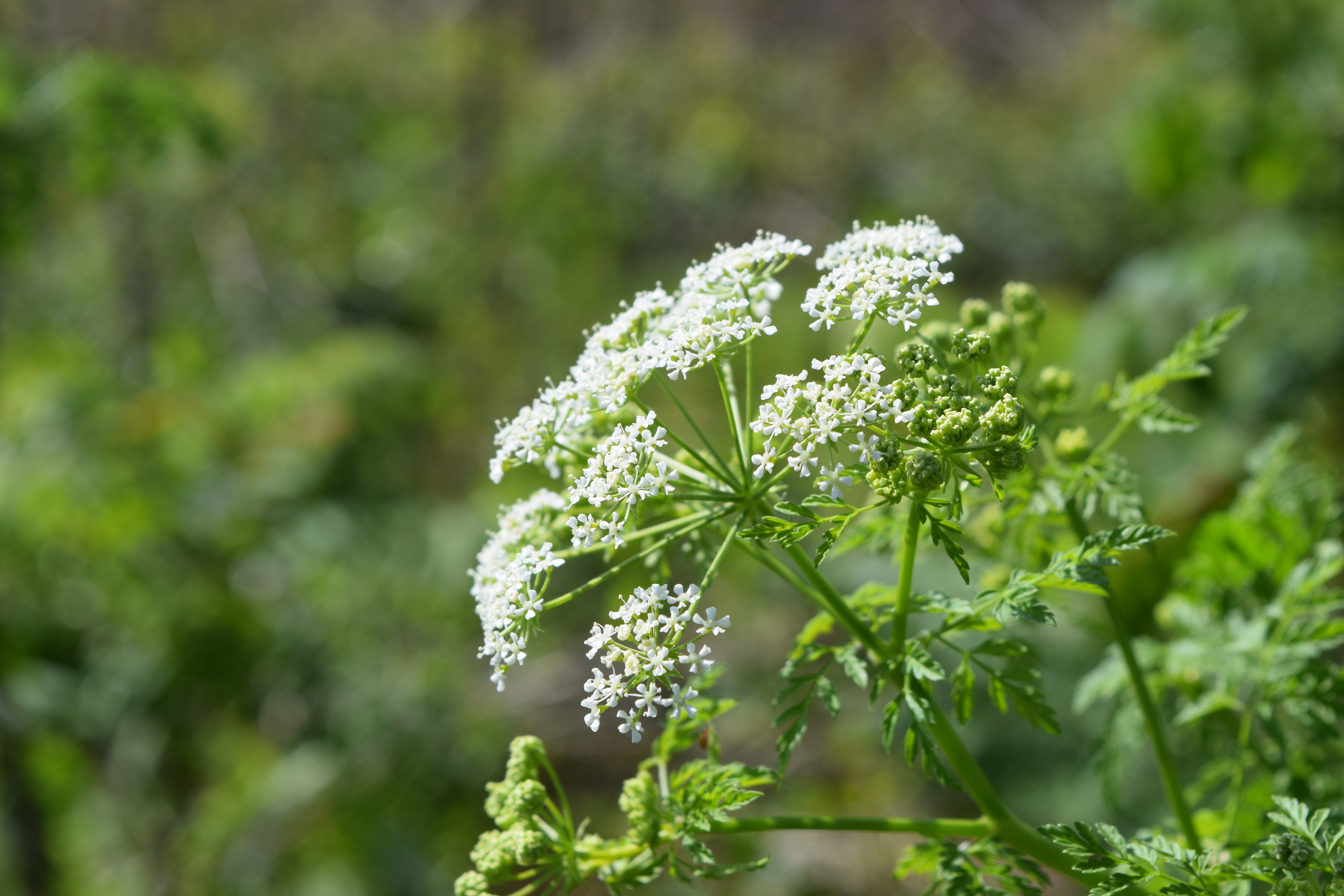
Flowers

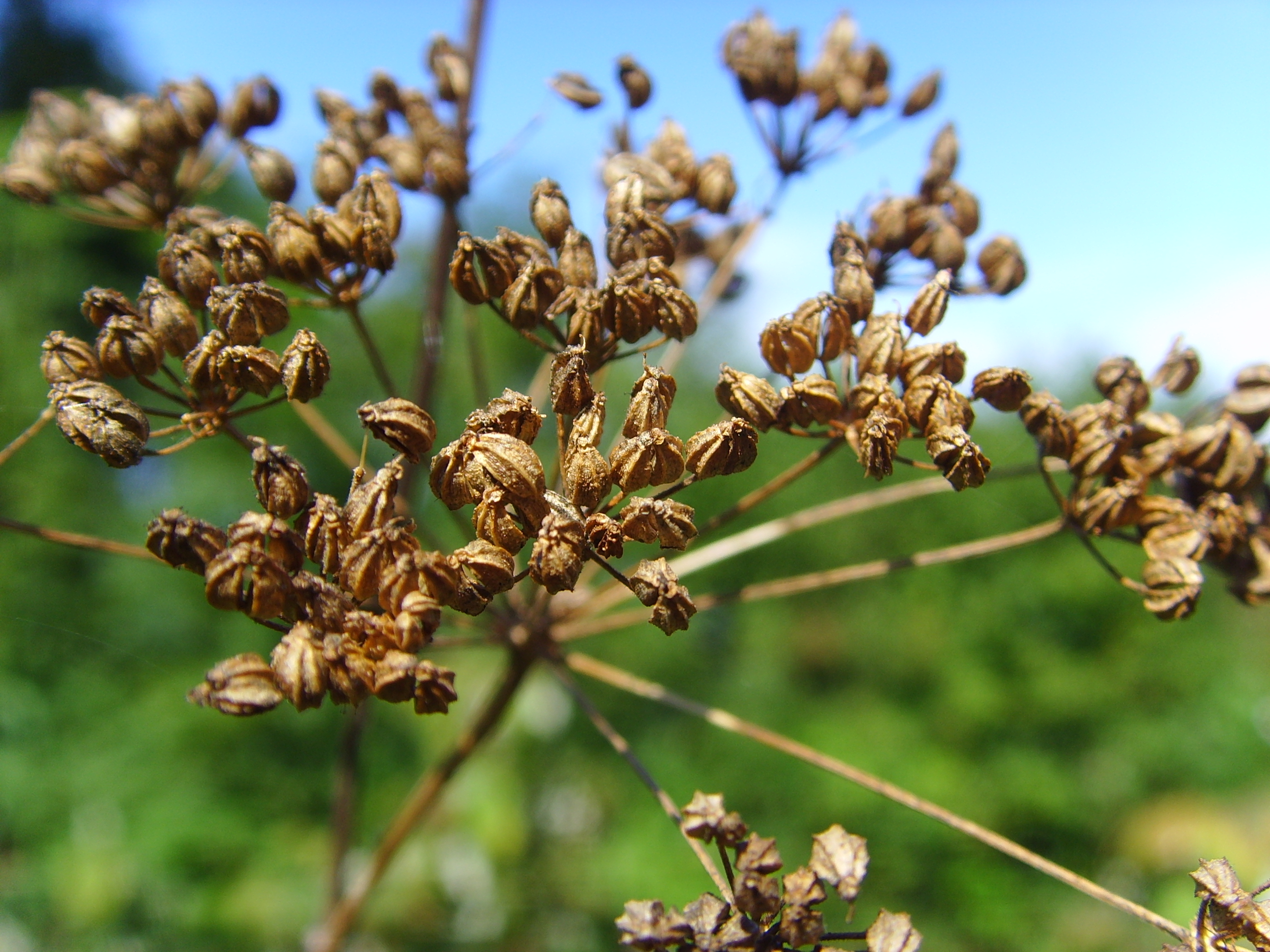
Seed heads in late summer

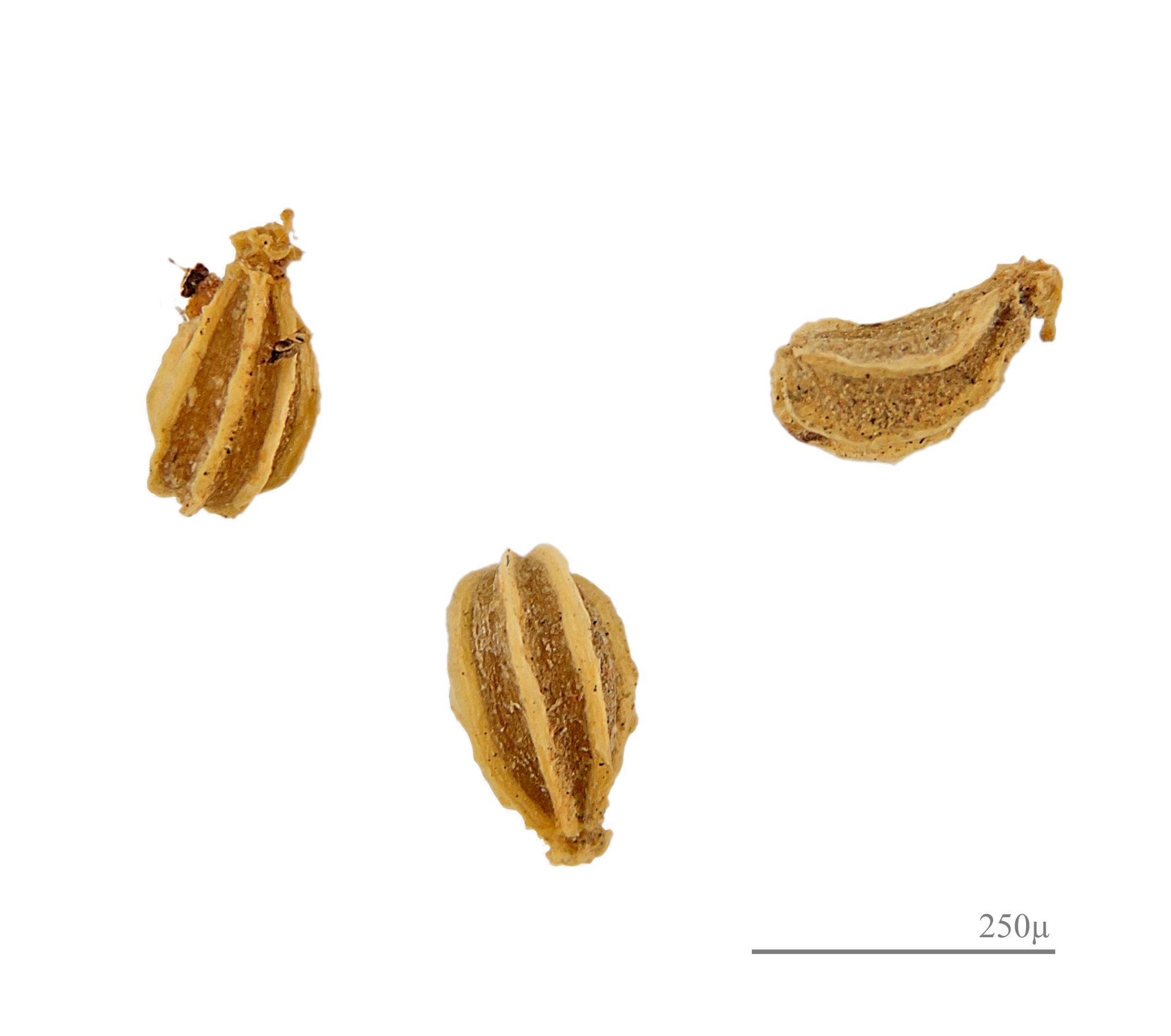
Schizocarp fruit

=== Similar species ===
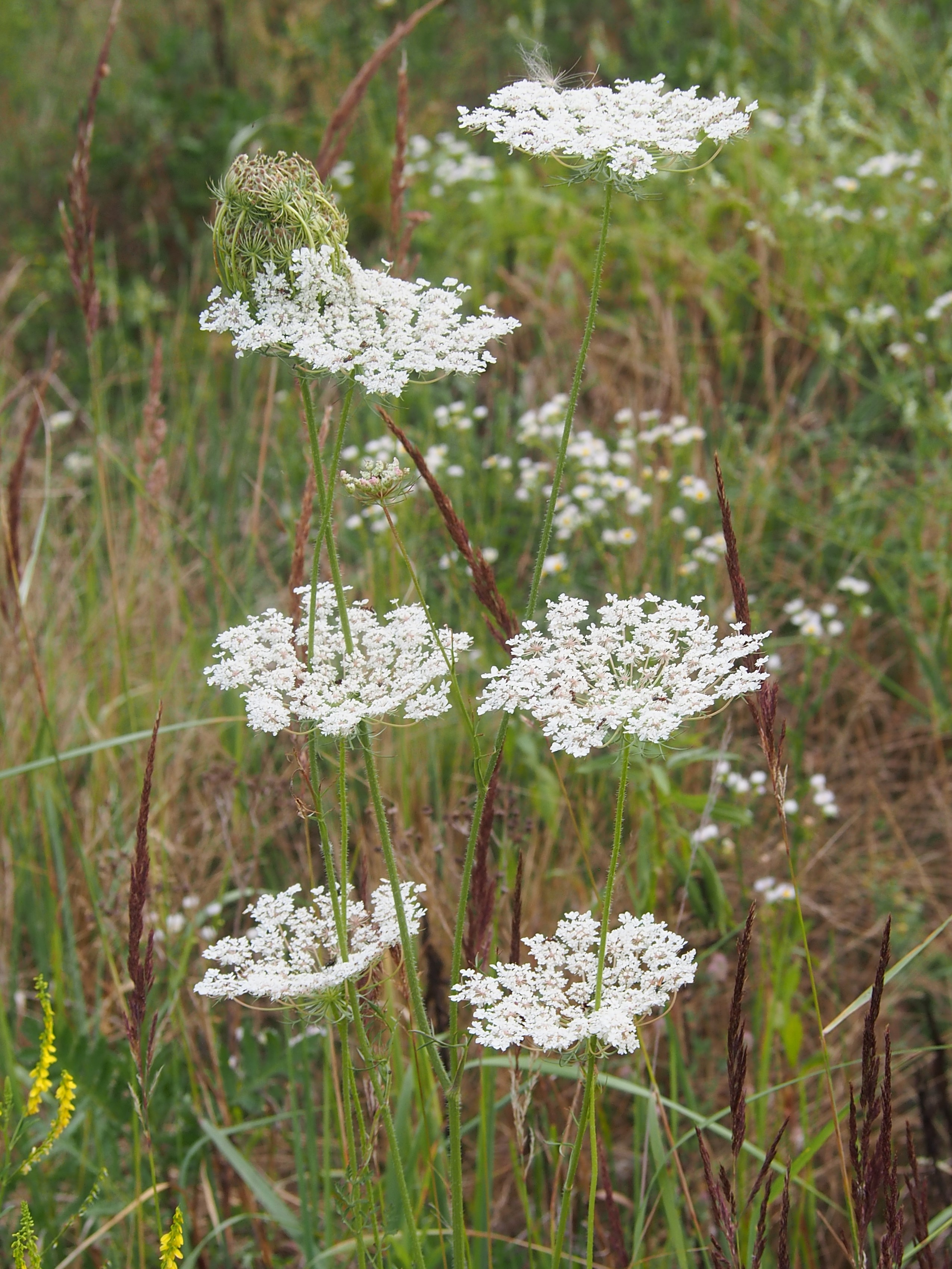
The wild carrot, Daucus carota, is often confused with poison hemlock.

Hemlock can be confused with several other species in the parsley family with potentially fatal results. Edible plants that can be confused with hemlock include cultivated carrots and the wild carrot (Daucus carota), parsnip (Pastinaca sativa), fennel (Foeniculum vulgare), and parsley (Petroselinum crispum).

Wild carrot has a hairy stem without purple markings, and grows less than 1 m (3 1/2 ft) tall. One can distinguish the two from each other by hemlock's smooth texture, vivid mid-green colour, purple spotting of stems and petioles, and flowering stems reaching a typical height of at least 1.5 m (5 ft)—twice the maximum for wild carrot.

Hemlock can be confused with harmless cow parsley (Anthriscus sylvestris), the wild herb Chaerophyllum macropodum used in Turkish cheesemaking, and deadly water hemlock (Cicuta). Water hemlock lacks the purple spots and disagreeable mouse-like smell of hemlock, and has a branching tuber that grows sideways in the soil instead of a vertical taproot.

== Taxonomy ==
The generic name Conium comes from the Ancient Greek κώνειον kṓneion: "hemlock". This may be related to konas (meaning to whirl), in reference to vertigo, one of the symptoms of ingesting the plant.

C. maculatum was the first species within the genus Conium to be described. It was identified by Carl Linnaeus in his 1753 publication, Species Plantarum. Maculatum means 'spotted', in reference to the purple blotches on the plant's stalks and is derived from the Latin macula.

Conium maculatum has 23 synonyms, 16 of them species, according to Plants of the World Online.

Table of Synonyms
Name	Year	Rank	Notes
Cicuta major Lam.	1779	species	≡ hom., nom. superfl.
Cicuta officinalis Crantz	1767	species	≡ hom.
Conium ceretanum Sennen	1926	species	= het.
Conium cicuta (Crantz) Neck.	1768	species	≡ hom.
Conium croaticum Waldst. & Kit. ex Willd.	1809	species	= het.
Conium leiocarpum (Boiss.) Stapf	1886	species	= het.
Conium maculatum var. barceloi O.Bolòs & Vigo	1974	variety	= het.
Conium maculatum subsp. croaticum (Waldst. & Kit. ex Willd.) Drude	1898	subspecies	= het.
Conium maculatum var. immaculatum Schur	1866	variety	= het.
Conium maculatum subsp. leiocarpum (Boiss.) Drude	1898	subspecies	= het.
Conium maculatum var. leiocarpum Boiss.	1872	variety	= het.
Conium maculatum subsp. viride (DC.) Espeut	2002	subspecies	= het.
Conium maculatum var. viride DC.	1830	variety	= het.
Conium maculosum Pall.	1771	species	= het.
Conium nodosum Fisch. ex Steud.	1821	species	= het., not validly publ.
Conium pyrenaicum Sennen & Elías	1928	species	= het.
Conium sibiricum Steud.	1840	species	= het., not validly publ.
Conium strictum Tratt.	1811	species	= het.
Conium tenuifolium Mill.	1768	species	= het.
Coriandrum cicuta Crantz	1762	species	≡ hom., nom. superfl.
Coriandrum maculatum (L.) Roth	1788	species	≡ hom.
Selinum conium (Vest) E.H.L.Krause	1904	species	= het.
Sium conium Vest	1805	species	= het.
Notes: ≡ homotypic synonym; = heterotypic synonym

=== Names ===
In British, Australian, and New Zealand English, the most prominent vernacular name is hemlock. This name is derived from the Old English words hymlice, hymlic, or hemlic, likely referring to Conium. More certainly in the 1500s, it referred to Conium maculatum and was used in herbalist texts. It entered Middle English as hemeluc, hemlok, hemlake, hemlocke, hemloc, or hemblock. In this period, it was first spelled as hemlock by William Shakespeare in his play Henry V in 1623. The herbaceous plant is unrelated to coniferous trees in the genus Tsuga, which are also called hemlocks and were thought to have a similar smell.

In American and Canadian English, it is typically called poison hemlock, though this name is also used elsewhere. This usage dates to 1757. Less frequent names used in both America and Australia include spotted hemlock and poison parsley. Other local or infrequent names in the United States include bunk, California-fern, cashes, herb-bonnet, kill-cow, Nebraska-fern, poisonroot, poison-snakeweed, poison stinkweed, St. Bennet's-herb, snakeweed, stinkweed, winter fern, and wode-whistle. In Australia, it is occasionally called wild carrot, wild parsnip, or snakeweed. In Canada, is it is also known as common poison-hemlock, deadly hemlock, fool's-parsley, spotted parsley, and spotted-hemlock.

== Distribution and habitat ==
The hemlock plant is native to Europe, Central Asia, and the Mediterranean region. It occurs in many British Isles counties, including in Northern Ireland. It has become naturalised in Asia, North America, Australia, and New Zealand. It is sometimes encountered around rivers in southeast Australia and Tasmania, where it has been considered an invasive species. Infestations and human contact with the plant are sometimes newsworthy events in the U.S. due to its toxicity. It spreads rapidly by seed, and is hard to eradicate as the seeds can lie dormant for up to 6 years.

== Ecology ==
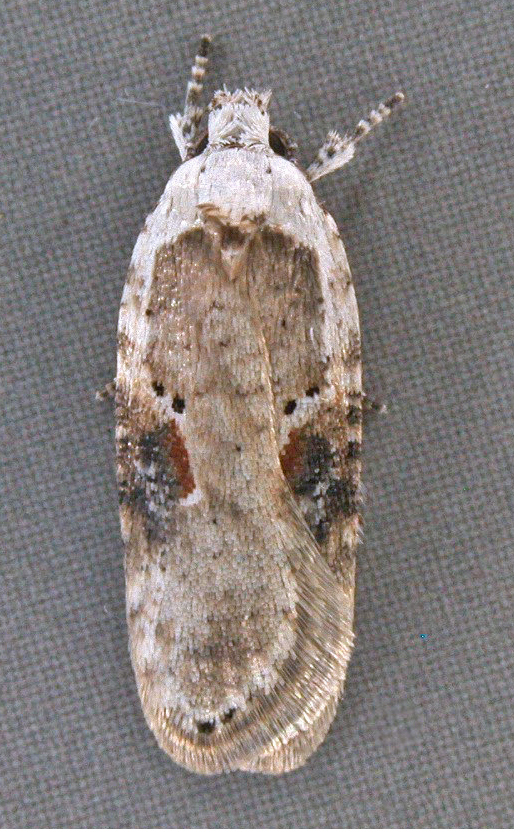
Agonopterix alstromeriana moth; its larva feeds on hemlock plants.

The plant is often found in poorly drained soil, particularly near streams, ditches, and other watery surfaces. It grows on roadsides, at the edges of cultivated fields and in waste areas. It grows in quite damp soil, but also on drier rough grassland, roadsides, and disturbed ground. It is used as a food plant by the larvae of some Lepidoptera, including silver-ground carpet moths and the poison hemlock moth (Agonopterix alstroemeriana). The latter has been widely used as a biological control agent for the plant.

It is a food source for caterpillars of the North American black swallowtail butterfly, though they have greater success on two other introduced plants, wild carrots and parsnips. Similarly, the anise swallowtail (Papilio zelicaon) in western North America depends largely on non-native plants like hemlock and fennel in urban and suburban areas of California.

Poison hemlock was introduced to the US from Europe in the 1800s as an ornamental garden plant called "winter fern". With it came the poison hemlock moth, which has spread across most of the US, but its efficacy at destroying the plant has been limited. The plant may be adapting to its predators by becoming more toxic.

== Toxicity ==
All parts of the plant can be poisonous, but the total amount of poisonous alkaloids varies significantly with the age of the plant and between parts. The roots of young, first-year plants contain only traces of poison or none at all. The leaves of seedlings have lower levels of poison than slightly older plants. In the spring of the second year the leaves are highly toxic, though not as poisonous as the flowers or seeds later in the season. The hollow stems remain deadly for up to three years after the plant has died. However, drying causes the plant to lose a large part of its toxic compounds. Plants which grew in sunny conditions can be twice as poisonous as plants that grew in wet and cloudy conditions.

The main toxic alkaloids are coniine and γ-coniceine, also called gamma-coniceine. Intoxication is reported in diverse groups of animals including pigs, bovids, turkeys, equines, rabbits, cats, and dogs. However, songbirds are less sensitive and have reportedly become toxic from absorbing the coniine from hemlock. Ingesting more than 150–300 milligrams of coniine, approximately equivalent to six to eight hemlock leaves, can be fatal for adult humans.

Grazing animals are most likely to be poisoned in the spring when other forage is unavailable. However, they may also be poisoned when hemlock has become mixed into grain, hay, or silage. Poison hemlock ingestion typically induces intense and fatal seizures in cattle. Even very small quantities have been shown to cause birth defects when ingested within 40–100 days of gestation.

Hemlock was one of many plants suggested by medieval writers as a possible cause of coturnism, a disease caused by eating common quail in certain seasons. Modern research focuses on annual woundwort (Stachys annua) as the most likely source of the toxin, though the cause is still unknown.

=== Alkaloids ===
(S)-(+)-coniine is the prevalent enantiomer found in Conium maculatum.

Conium contains the piperidine alkaloids coniine, N-methylconiine, conhydrine, pseudoconhydrine, and gamma-coniceine (or γ-coniceine), which is the precursor of the other hemlock alkaloids.

The major alkaloid found in flower buds is γ-coniceine. This molecule is transformed into coniine during the later stages of fruit development. The alkaloids are volatile; as such, researchers assume that these alkaloids play an important role in attracting pollinators, such as butterflies and bees.

=== Toxicology ===
Coniine has pharmacological properties and a chemical structure similar to nicotine. Coniine acts directly on the central nervous system through inhibitory action on nicotinic acetylcholine receptors. Coniine can be dangerous to humans and livestock, and with its high potency, the ingestion of seemingly small doses can easily result in respiratory collapse and death.

In laboratory experiments on mice, γ-coniceine was lethal at just 0.14 the equivalent dose of coniine while N-methylconiine took 1.5 times the equivalent dose of coniine when injected. Oral administration of coniine required about five times as much for a lethal dose. Compared to coniine by oral administration γ-coniceine required 0.12 times as much and N-methylconiine required 2.0 times as much.

The alkaloid content in C. maculatum affects the thermoregulatory centre by a phenomenon called peripheral vasoconstriction, resulting in hypothermia in calves. In addition, the alkaloid content stimulates the sympathetic ganglia and reduces the influence of the parasympathetic ganglia in rats and rabbits, causing an increased heart rate.

Coniine has significant toxic effects on the kidneys. The presence of rhabdomyolysis and acute tubular necrosis has been demonstrated in patients who died from hemlock poisoning. Some of these patients had acute kidney injury. Contact of the leaves with bare skin can result in rash and persistent blisters through phototoxicity, the sensitisation of the skin to sunlight.

Shortly after ingestion, the alkaloids induce neuromuscular dysfunction that is potentially fatal due to failure of the respiratory muscles. Acute toxicity, if not lethal, may be followed by spontaneous recovery, provided further exposure is avoided. Death can be prevented by artificial ventilation until the effects wear off after 48–72 hours. For an adult, the ingestion of more than 100 mg (0.1 gram) of coniine (about six to eight fresh leaves, or a smaller dose of the seeds or root) may be fatal. Narcosis-like effects can be observed as soon as 30 minutes after ingestion of green leaves of the plant, with victims falling asleep and gradually becoming unconscious until death occurs a few hours later. The onset of symptoms is similar to that caused by curare, with an ascending muscular paralysis leading to paralysis of the respiratory muscles and ultimately death by oxygen deprivation.

The English physician and botanist John Harley worked with a preparation of hemlock called succus conii, testing it on himself and recording the effects in his book The Old Vegetable Neurotics published in 1869.

An hour and a quarter after taking the dose, I first felt decided weakness in my legs. The giddiness and diminution of motor power continued to increase for the next fifteen minutes. An hour and a half after taking the dose, these effects attained their maximum; and at this time I was cold, pale, and tottering. ... The mind remained perfectly clear and calm, and the brain active throughout; but the body seemed heavy, and well-nigh asleep.

As there is no specific antidote, prevention is the only way to deal with agricultural production losses caused by the plant. The use of herbicides and grazing with less-susceptible animals (such as sheep) have been suggested as control methods. Contrary to popular belief, scientific studies have disproven the claim that the plant's alkaloids can enter the human food chain via milk and fowl.

== In culture ==
=== Ancient Greece ===
In ancient Greece, hemlock was used to poison condemned prisoners. Conium maculatum is the plant that killed Theramenes, Socrates, Polemarchus, and Phocion. Socrates, the most famous victim of hemlock poisoning, was sentenced to death at his trial; he took an infusion of hemlock. In Greek mythology, poisonous plants like hemlock were sacred to the goddess Hecate and her daughters Circe and Medea.

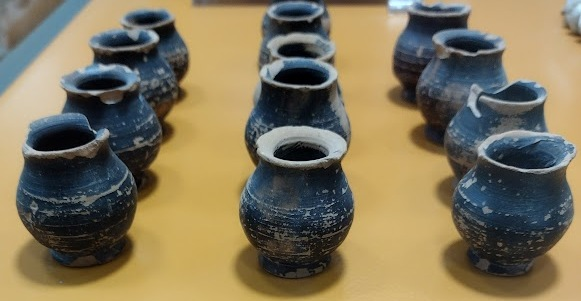
Cups of the type used to administer hemlock poison in ancient Greece, 5th century BC

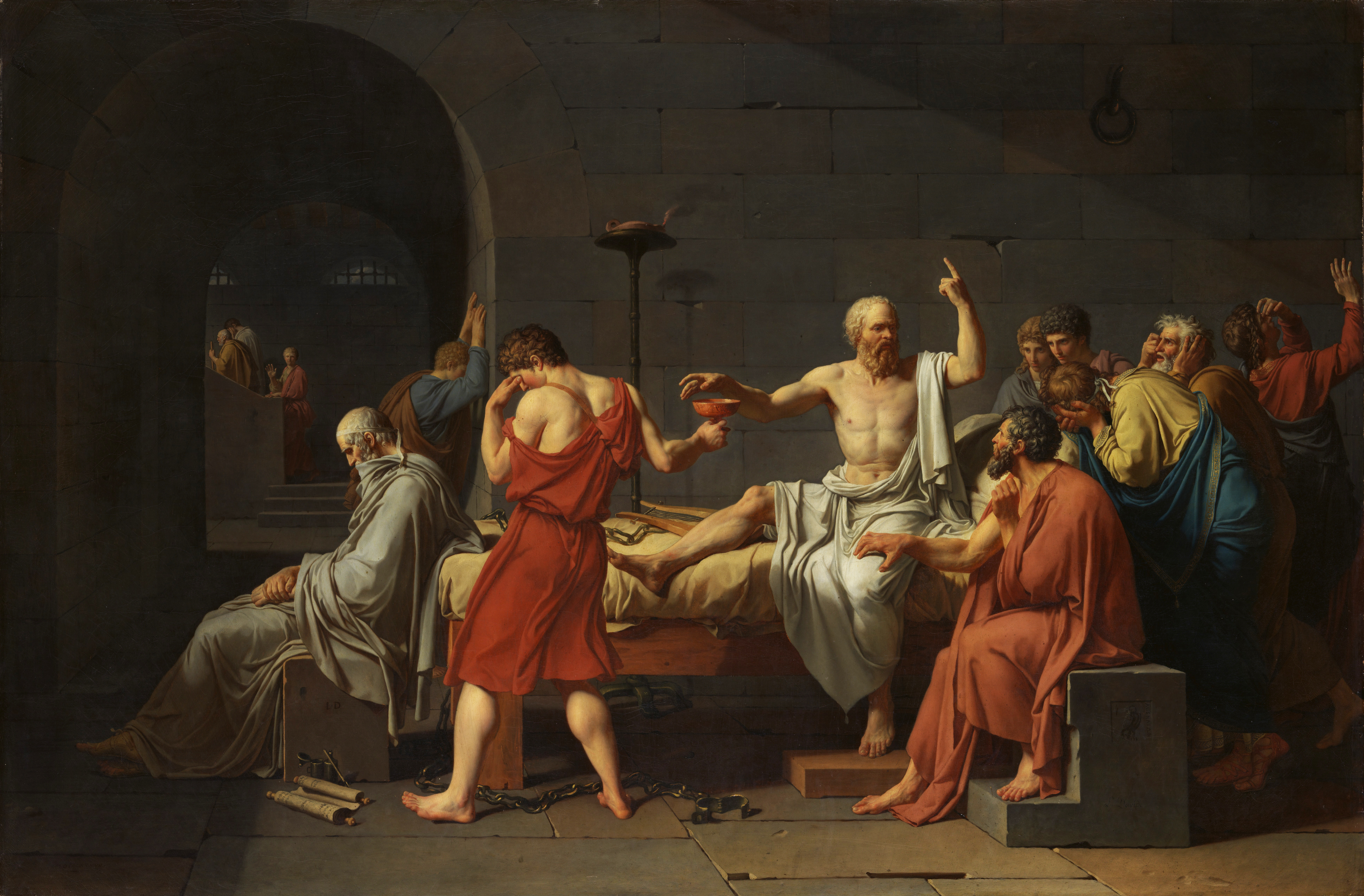
The Death of Socrates,
by Jacques-Louis David, 1787

=== Uses ===
In high mountain areas of Georgia, hemlock leaves were used as a spring food after long winters. It required careful cooking, often in several changes of water. Other poisonous leaves used in this fashion included cow parsnips (Heracleum species), potatoes, and lilies. Locals speaking to ethnobotanical researchers knew the poisonous nature of the plants and reported the practice to have largely died out with better roads and greater availability of cultivated foods in markets.

Hemlock was used as a medicine in ancient times, though great care was required due to its toxicity. In Medieval Europe, it was only administered as a remedy for rabies, known at the time as "the bite of mad dogge", taken in wine together with betony and fennel seed. Later uses included a final, desperate attempt to cure virulent poisons such as strychnine. In the 1400s and 1500s European monks roasted the root and applied it externally to the feet, hands, and wrists for pain from gout. The popular herbalist Nicholas Culpeper wrote in the 1650s that it was under the control of Saturn giving it a cold and dangerous character. He recommended it for external use for inflammation and swelling and the roasted root on the hands for gout. From the 1760s, it was applied to cancerous ulcers.

In the Victorian language of flowers, hemlock flowers were used as a symbol meaning, "You will be the death of me". From 1864 to 1898 hemlock was officially listed as a medicine in the London and Edinburgh pharmacopoeias. The last listing of it was in the British Pharmaceutical Codex in 1934.

== Removal ==
If the infestation is relatively small, it is recommended to dig out the entire plant including the roots with proper protective equipment. One should wear clothing that covers exposed skin, eye protection, and gloves. Many herbicides will also work for killing a spread of hemlock.

== See also ==
- List of poisonous plants
