= Conium alkaloids =

Group of chemical compounds

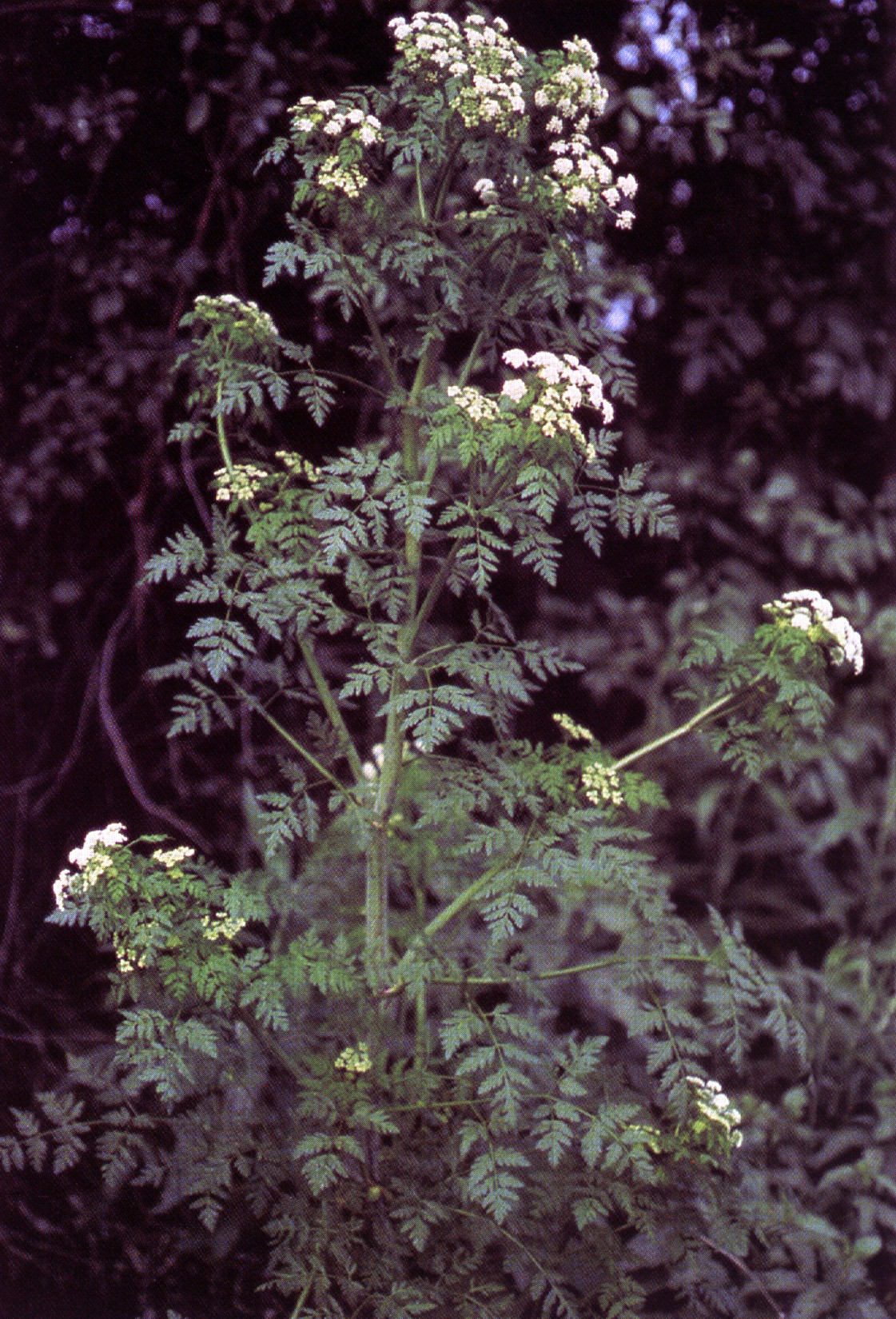
Spotted hemlock (Conium maculatum)

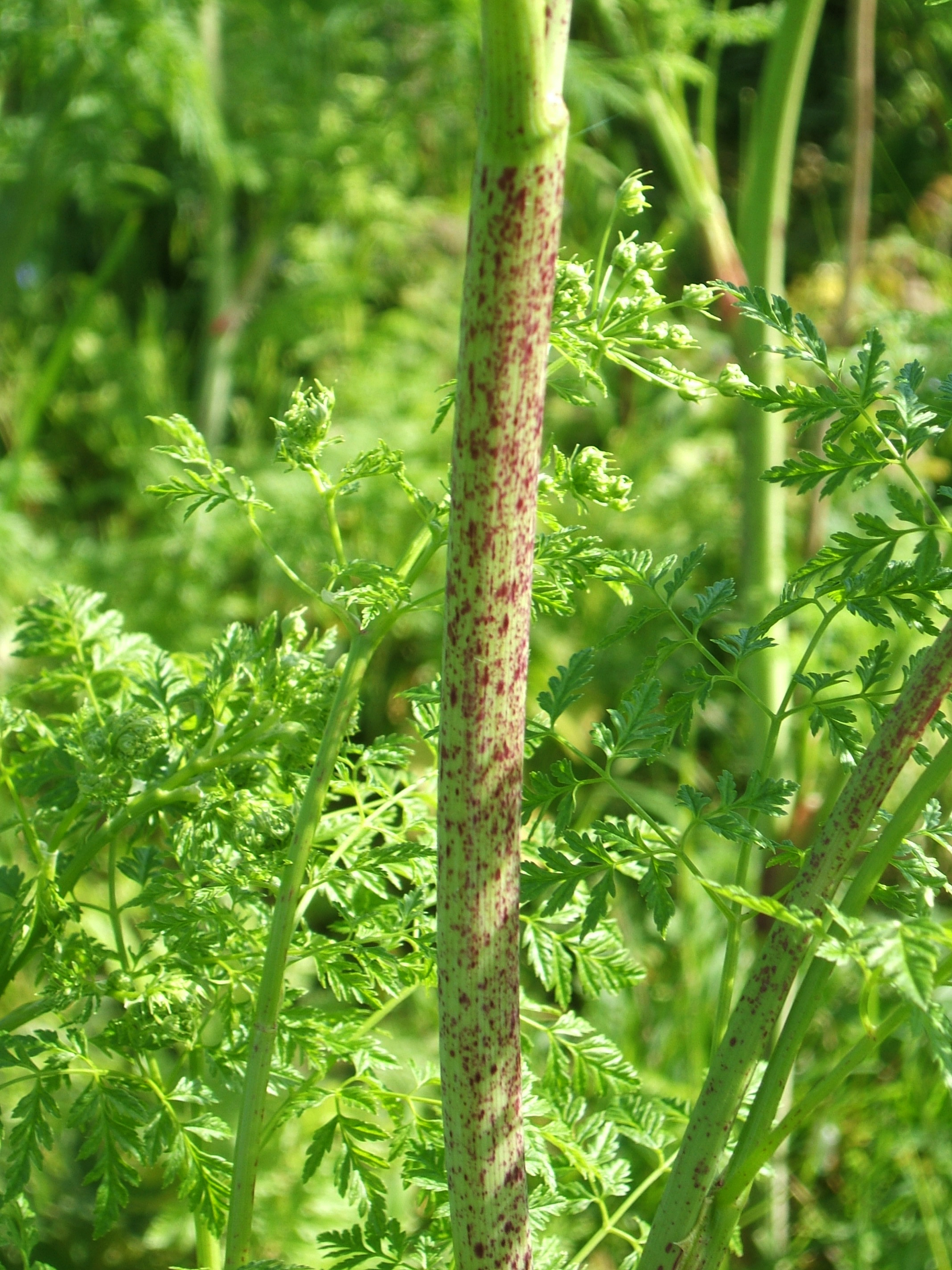
The stem is usually spotted red

Conium alkaloids are natural products of the piperidine alkaloid type.

== Occurrence ==
Conium alkaloids are found in spotted hemlock. The mature fruits may contain up to 3.5% alkaloids.

== Representative ==
The main alkaloid is coniine. Other representatives are γ-conicein, conhydrin, pseudoconhydrin, and N-methylconiin.

(+)-Coniine

(+)-Conhydrin

(+)-Pseudoconhydrin

Most Conium alkaloids are liquid at room temperature.

== Properties ==
500 mg of coniin is fatal to a human. Coniin is the poison of the spotted hemlock. Poisoning results in nausea, vomiting, salivation, and diarrhea. Within half an hour to an hour, paralysis of the chest muscles occurs, which is fatal.

== History ==
In ancient times, aqueous extracts of this plant (hemlock cup) were administered. In 399 BC, Socrates was sentenced to death by the cup of hemlock as a "free thinker and seducer of youth."
