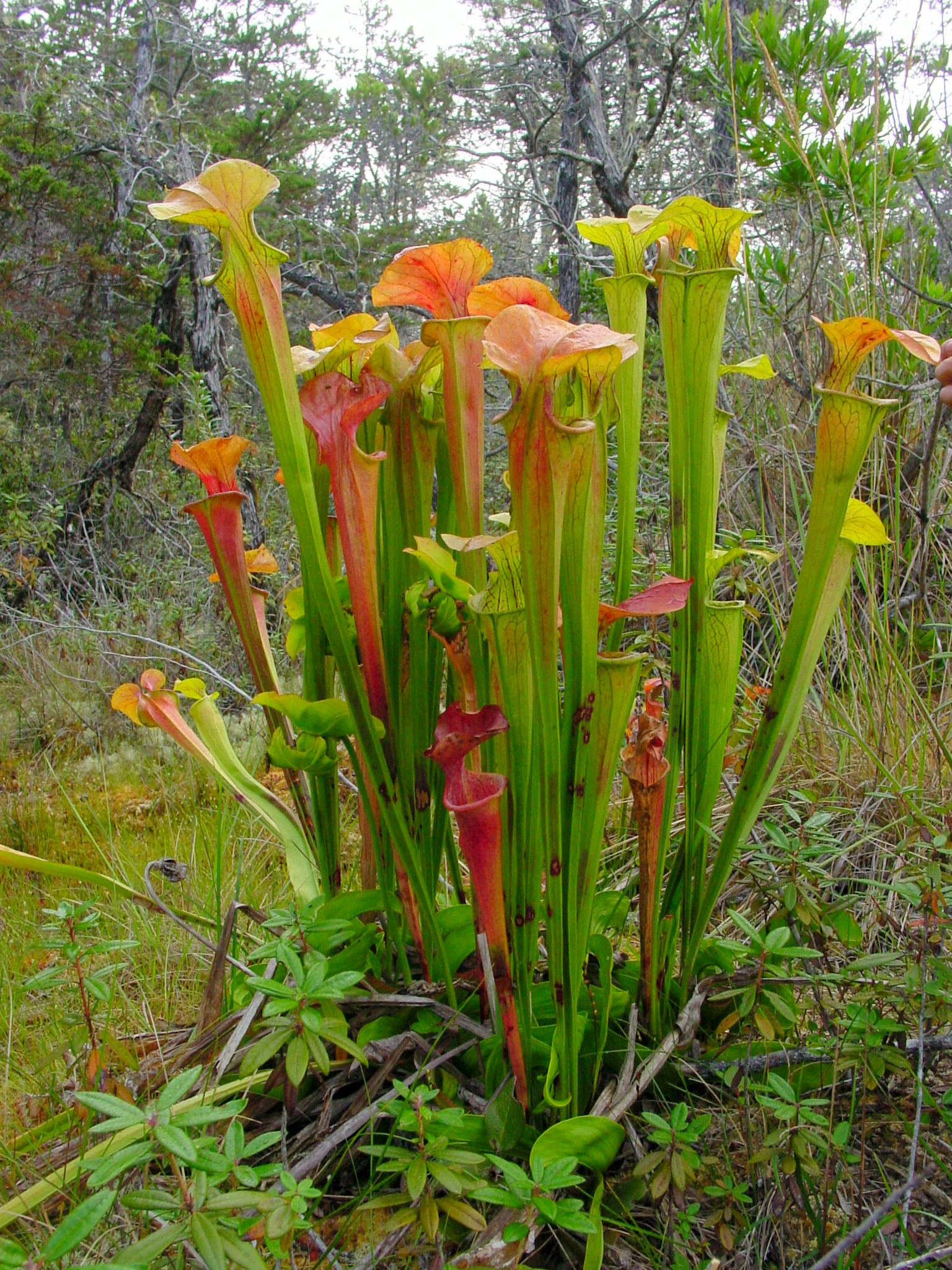

Conservation status
- Critically Endangered (IUCN 2.3)

- Imperiled (NatureServe)
- CITES Appendix I

Scientific classification
- Kingdom: Plantae
- Clade: Tracheophytes
- Clade: Angiosperms
- Clade: Eudicots
- Clade: Asterids
- Order: Ericales
- Family: Sarraceniaceae
- Genus: Sarracenia
- Species: S. oreophila

Binomial name
- Sarracenia oreophila (Kearney) Wherry (1933)
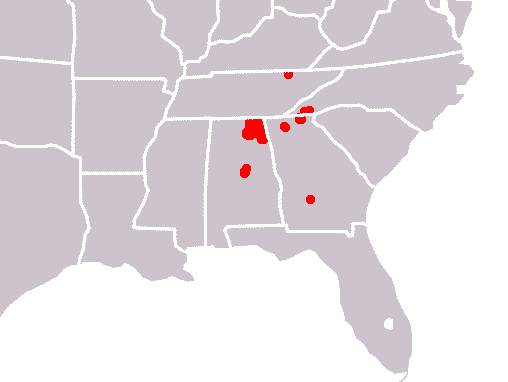
- Sarracenia oreophila range

Synonyms
- Sarracenia catesbaei auct. non Elliott: (auct. non Mast.: Mohr) Mohr (1901); Sarracenia flava var. catesbaei auct. non Mast.: Mohr (1897); Sarracenia flava var. oreophila Kearney (1900); Sarracenia flava auct. non L.: Macfarl. (1908) [=S. flava/S. oreophila]

= Sarracenia oreophila =

Green pitcher plant

Species of carnivorous plant

Sarracenia oreophila, also known as the green pitcherplant, is a carnivorous plant in the genus Sarracenia. It has highly modified leaves in the form of pitchers that act as pitfall traps for prey. The narrow pitcher leaves are tapered tubes that rise up to 75 centimetres (30 in) from the ground, with a mouth 6 to 10 centimetres (2.4 to 3.9 in) in circumference Like all the Sarracenia, it is native to North America. Sarracenia oreophila is the most endangered of all Sarracenia species, its range limited to a handful of sites in northern Alabama, North Carolina, Georgia, and—historically—Tennessee.

== Origin of name ==
Saracenia oreophila takes its name from the mountainous regions where it grows. The generic name Sarracenia is from Michel Sarrazin [1659–1734], a French-Canadian naturalist who first described a specimen of the genus, and oreophila literally means "mountain-loving," from Greek oreophilos (oros, -eos, "mountain," + philos, "loving").

== Morphology and carnivory ==
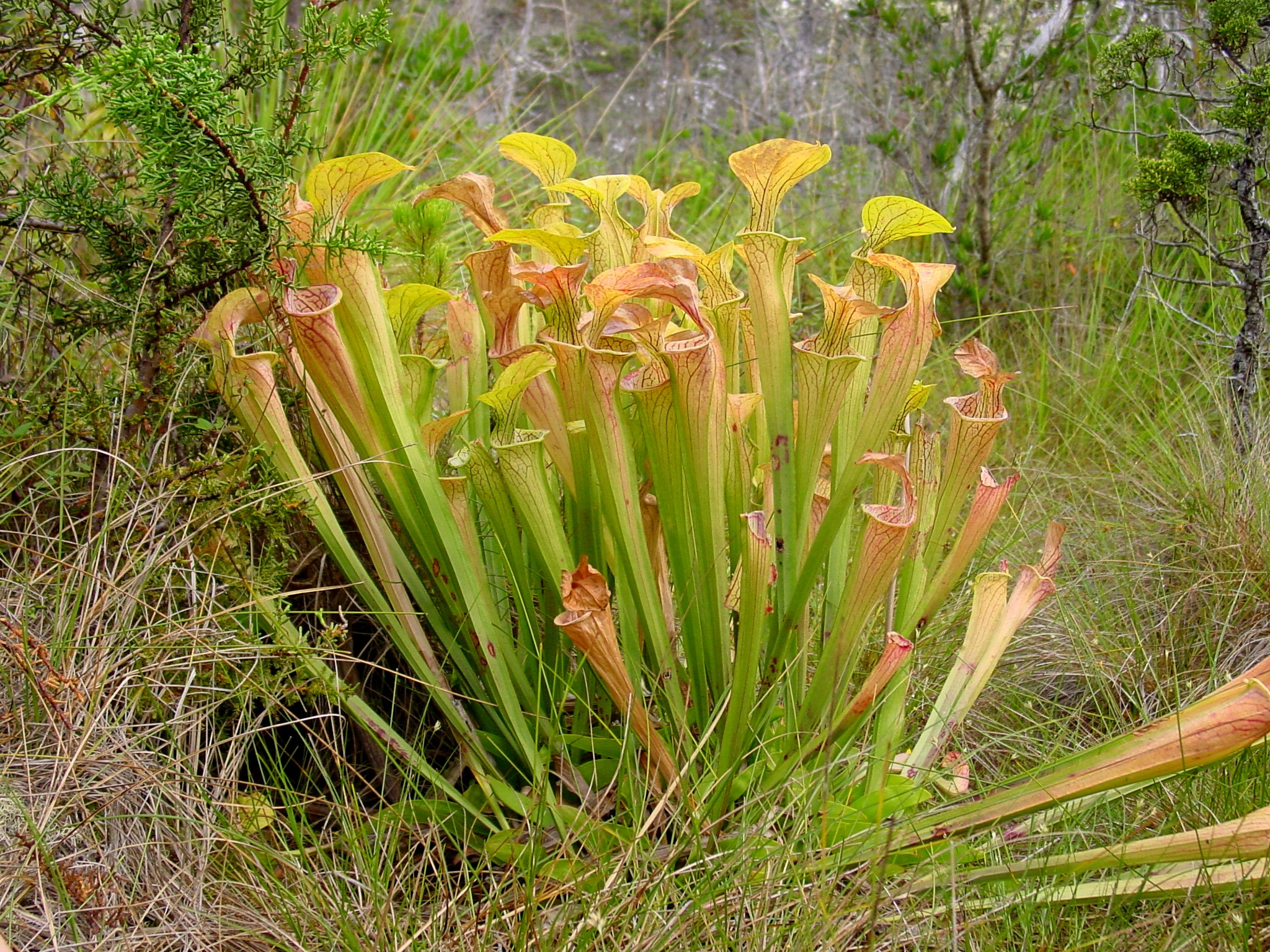
The tubular leaves of the green pitcher plant lure, trap, and digest insect prey

Like other members of the genus Sarracenia, the green pitcher plant traps insects using a tubular rolled leaf which collects digestive juices at the bottom. The pitcher tube of this species is similar to that of Sarracenia flava, but has a wider pitcher mouth and neck and is usually somewhat shorter, reaching only 60 cm. (24 in). The uppermost part of the leaf is flared into a lid (the operculum), which prevents excess rain from entering the pitcher and diluting the digestive secretions within. The upper regions of the pitcher are covered in short, stiff, downwards-pointing hairs, which serve to guide insects alighting on the upper portions of the leaf towards the opening of the pitcher tube. The opening of the pitcher tube is retroflexed into a 'nectar roll' or peristome, whose surface is studded with nectar-secreting glands. Prey entering the tube find that their footing is made extremely uncertain by the smooth, waxy secretions found on the surfaces of the upper portion of the tube. Insects losing their footing on this surface plummet to the bottom of the tube, where a combination of digestive fluid, wetting agents and inward-pointing hairs prevent their escape. Some large insects (such as wasps) have been reported to escape from the pitchers on occasion by chewing their way out through the wall of the tube.

Pitchers can vary from all green plants to lightly and heavily veined examples, as well as cultivars with heavily pigmented throats. Traps also take on a pink or red flush as they age.

== Flowers ==
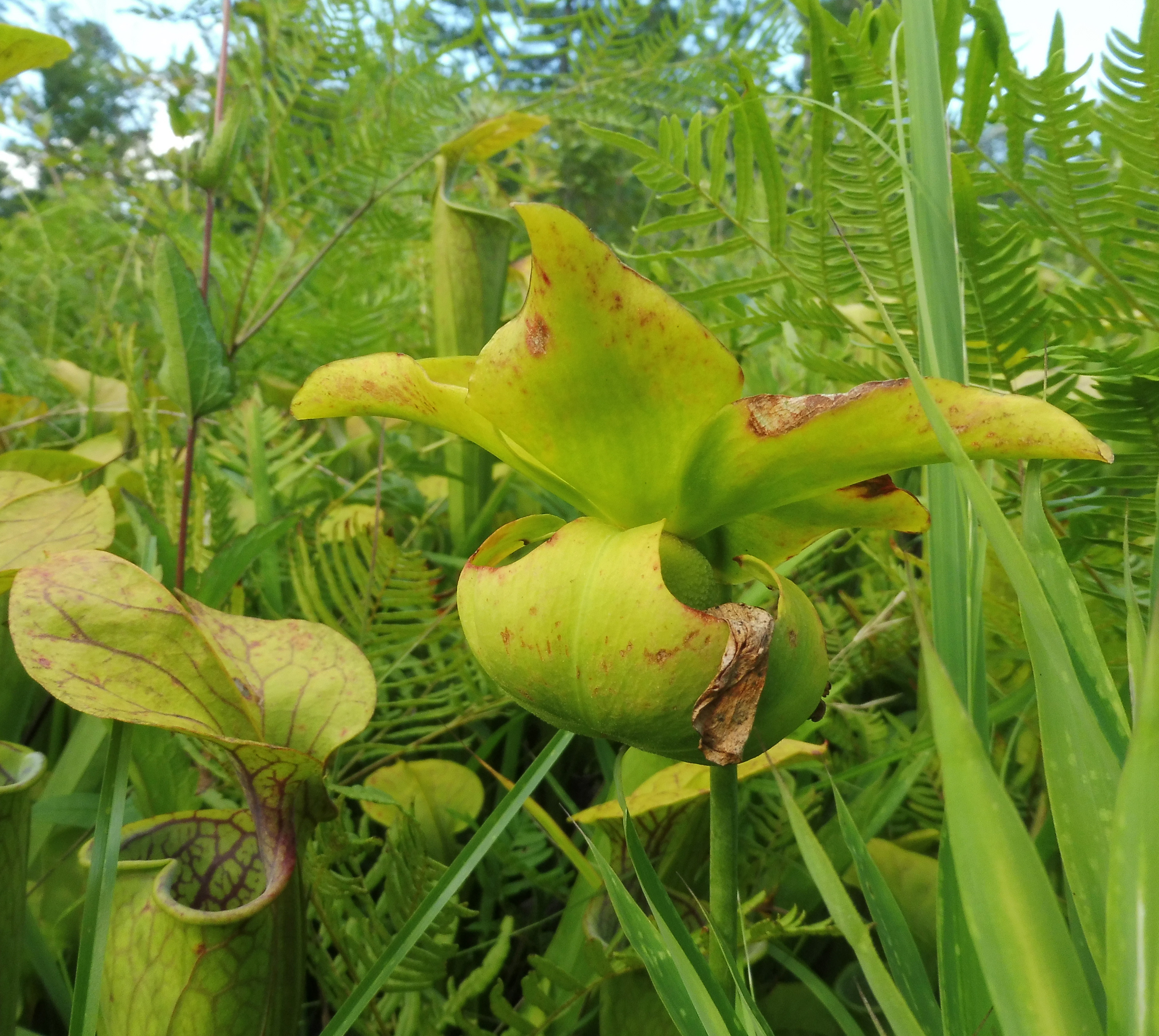
Detail of S. oreophila flower

See also the section on Sarracenia flowers in the main article.

In spring, the plant produces large, yellow flowers with 5-fold symmetry. The yellow petals are long and strap-like, and dangle over the umbrella-like style of the flower, which is held upside down at the end of a 50 cm long scape. The stigma of the flower are found at the tips of the 'spokes' of this umbrella. Pollinating insects generally enter the flower from above, forcing their way into the cavity between the petals and umbrella, and depositing any pollen they are carrying on the stigmata as they enter. The pollinators generally exit the flower, having been dusted with the plant's own pollen, by lifting a petal. This one-way system helps to ensure cross pollination.

== Growth cycle ==
In late summer and autumn, the plant stops producing carnivorous leaves, and instead produces flat, non-carnivorous phyllodia. In this species, these are highly recurved, short, and sickle-shaped. The natural habitat of this species dries quickly during July and the small phyllodia are probably easier to maintain with the little water available than its spring pitchers. This is a genetic adaptation and plants kept permanently wet in cultivation also lose their pitchers in mid summer. Also of note is the simultaneous flowering and pitchering at the beginning of the season as drier conditions prevent later growth of pitchers post flower production.

== Taxonomy ==
The International Carnivorous Plant Society recognizes three cultivars of this species as follows:

- S. oreophila 'Don Schnell'
- S. oreophila 'Heavily Veined'
- S. oreophila 'Sand Mountain'

The cultivar 'Don Schnell' is extinct—the only specimen died in a greenhouse catastrophe.

== Threats ==
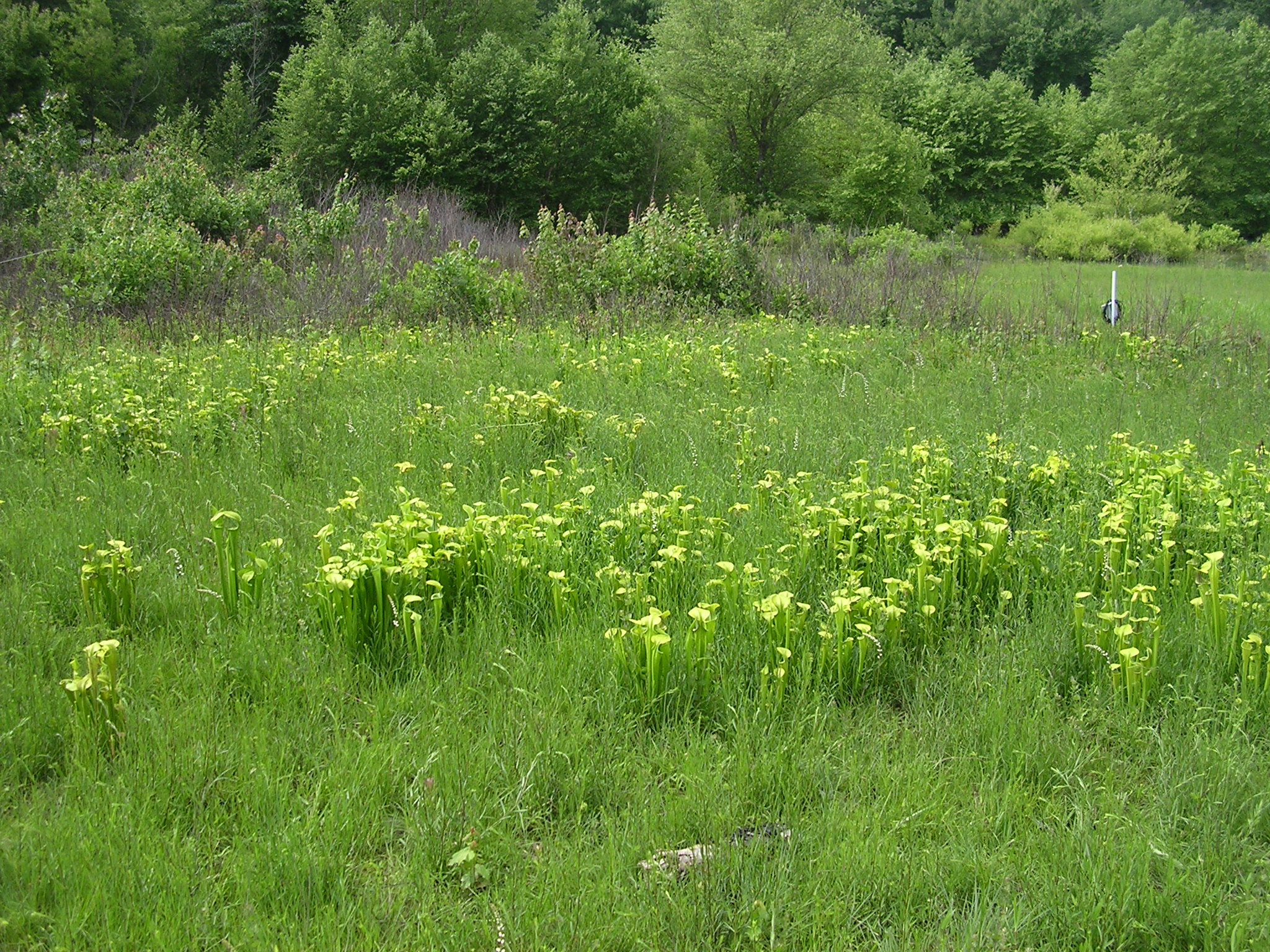
Green pitcher plant habitat

The green pitcher plant has suffered a devastating decline throughout its former range. Development for both urban and rural uses has led to the widespread alteration of the specific bog habitat of this species. Pitcher plants have also been over-collected for the commercial plant trade; such rare and unusual species are very popular with collectors. Today, around 34 naturally occurring populations persist but these are small and highly fragmented; most consist of fewer than 50 individuals.

== Conservation ==
Green pitcherplants are listed as Endangered on the United States Endangered Species Act and there is an Action Plan for their recovery. The Recovery Plan focuses on the effective protection of existing populations, as the most important threat to the future of the green pitcher plant is over-collection. Collection is banned by legislation within the United States. The species is listed on Appendix I of the Convention on International Trade in Endangered Species (CITES), meaning commercial international trade in wild-sourced specimens (including parts and derivatives) is prohibited, while non-commercial international trade is regulated. Ex-situ conservation measures are also in place; seeds are stored at the USDA National Seed Technology Laboratory in Fort Collins, and Atlanta Botanical Garden is propagating plants from seeds for future reintroduction programmes.
