= Conium divaricatum =

Scientific classification
- Kingdom: Plantae
- Clade: Tracheophytes
- Clade: Angiosperms
- Clade: Eudicots
- Clade: Asterids
- Order: Apiales
- Family: Apiaceae
- Genus: Conium
- Species: C. divaricatum

Binomial name
- Conium divaricatum Boiss. & Orph.

Species of flowering plant

Conium divaricatum is a species of flowering plant in the family Apiaceae, native to Greece, including Crete. It was first described in 1856. The plant is phytochemically distinct from conium maculatum, and is considered a separate species. The Classical Greek philosopher Socrates is believed to have been executed with hemlock, though scholars are unsure whether it was c. maculatum or c. divaricatum.
