= C8H17NO =

The molecular formula C_{8}H_{17}NO (molar mass: 143.23 g/mol, exact mass: 143.1310 u) may refer to:

- Conhydrine
- Valnoctamide
- Valpromide, or 2-propylpentanamide
