= N-Methylconiine =

- N-Methylconiine Chemical structures of D- (left) and L-N-methylconiine

Names
- IUPAC name 1-Methyl-2-propylpiperidine

Identifiers
CAS Number	35305-13-6
3D model (JSmol)	Interactive image
Beilstein Reference	79936
ChEBI	CHEBI:32
ChemSpider	148393
KEGG	C10159
PubChem CID	338921
UNII	KO6UG4YXE1
CompTox Dashboard (EPA)	DTXSID901310152
- InChI: InChI=1S/C9H19N/c1-3-6-9-7-4-5-8-10(9)2/h9H,3-8H2,1-2H3 Key: CUBHREGSQFAWDJ-UHFFFAOYSA-N
- SMILES: CCCC1CCCCN1C

Properties
Chemical formula	C_{9}H_{19}N
Molar mass	141.258 g·mol^{−1}
Density	(d) 0.8318 g cm^{−3} at 24.3 °C (l) 0.8349 g cm^{−3} at 20 °C
Boiling point	173 to 174 °C (343 to 345 °F; 446 to 447 K)
- Except where otherwise noted, data are given for materials in their standard state (at 25 °C [77 °F], 100 kPa). verify (what is ?) Infobox references

N-Methylconiine is a poisonous alkaloid found in poison hemlock in small quantities.

== Isolation and properties ==
The d-(+)-stereoisomer of N-methylconiine is reported to occur in hemlock in small quantities, and methods for its isolation are described by Wolffenstein and by von Braun. It is a colourless, oily, coniine-like liquid, specific rotation [α]_{D} +81.33° at 24.3 °C. The salts are crystalline ("B" marks one molecule of the base): the hydrochloride, B•HCl, forms masses of needles, mp. 188 °C; the platinichloride, B_{2}•H_{2}PtCl_{6}, has mp. 158 °C.

The l-(−)-stereoisomer was obtained by Ahrens from residues left in the isolation of coniine as hydrobromide or by removing coniine as the nitroso-compound. It is a colourless, coniine-like liquid, bp. 175.6 °C/767 mmHg, specific rotation [α]_{D} −81.92° at 20 °C. The monohydrochloride crystallises in leaflets, mp. 191–192 °C; the monohydrobromide in leaflets, mp. 189–190 °C; the platinichloride in orange crystals, mp. 153–154 °C; the aurichloride in leaflets, mp. 77–78 °C; and the picrate in long needles, mp. 121–122 °C.

== Synthesis ==
N-Methyl-d-coniine was prepared by the action of potassium methyl sulfate on coniine by Passon. Hess and Eichel have shown that d-coniine with formaldehyde and formic acid yields an active N-methyl-d-coniine, and that methyl-isopelletierine hydrazone yields N-methyl-dl-coniine when heated with sodium ethoxide at 150–170 °C.
