= Römpp Encyclopedia Natural Products =

Encyclopedia of natural products

The Römpp Encyclopedia Natural Products is an encyclopedia of natural products written by German chemists who specialize in this area of science. It is published by Thieme Medical Publishers.

== See also ==
- Römpp's Chemistry Lexicon
