= Piperidine alkaloids =

Class of chemical compounds

Piperidine, the parent compound of piperidine alkaloids

Piperidine alkaloids are naturally occurring alkaloids, which are chemically derived from piperidine.

Alkaloids with a piperidine functional group are widespread and are usually further subdivided according to their occurrence and biogenetic origin. The most well-known representative of the piperidine alkaloids is piperine, which is responsible for the pungent taste of ground black pepper.

Piperine

Lobeline

(S)-Coniine

Sedamine

Solenopsin

== Literature ==
- Entry on Piperidin-Alkaloide. at: Römpp Online. Georg Thieme Verlag, retrieved 19. Juni 2014.
