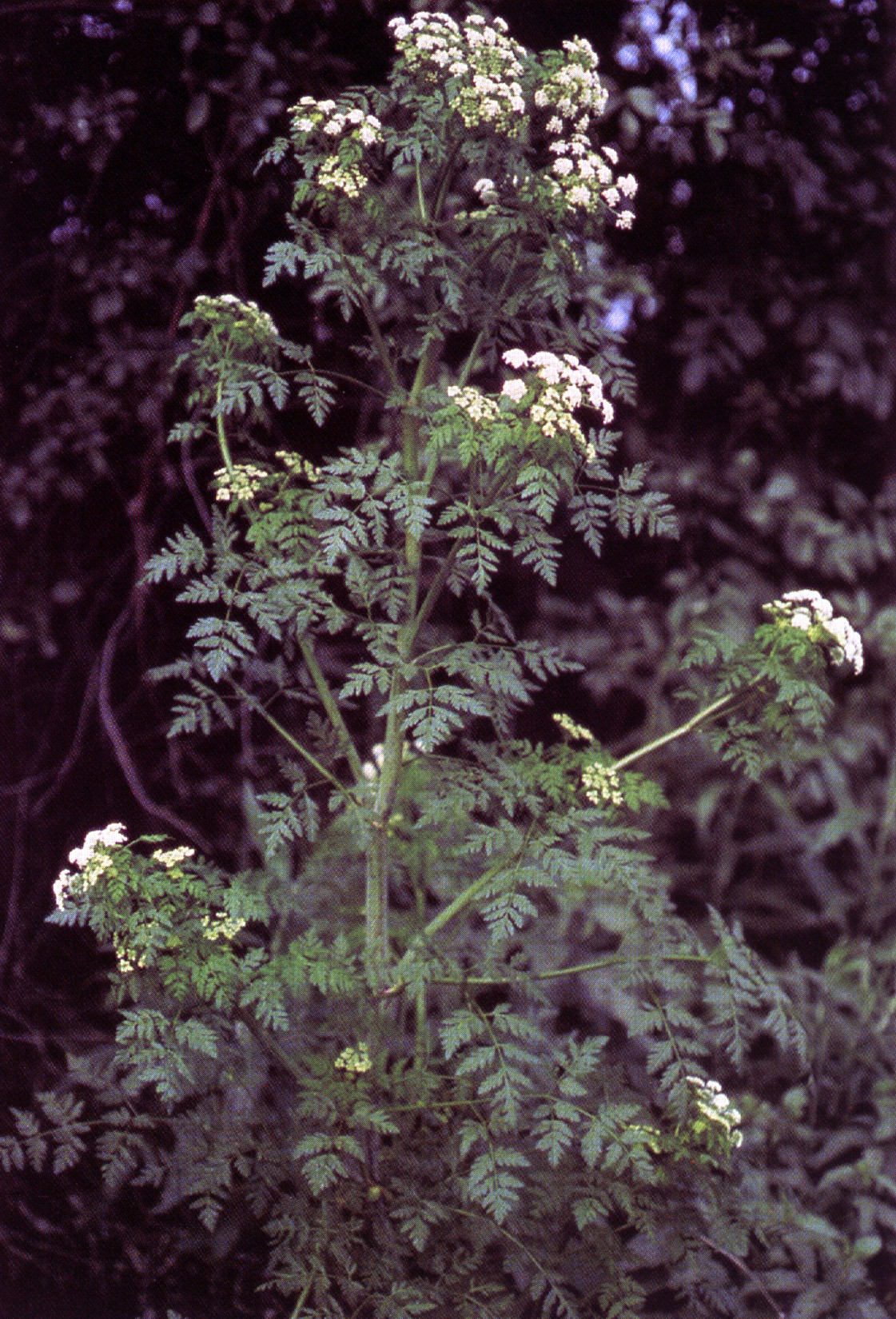
- Conium maculatum

Scientific classification
- Kingdom: Plantae
- Clade: Tracheophytes
- Clade: Angiosperms
- Clade: Eudicots
- Clade: Asterids
- Order: Apiales
- Family: Apiaceae
- Subfamily: Apioideae
- Genus: Conium; L.

Species
- See text.

= Conium =

Genus of flowering plants in the celery family

Conium (/koʊˈnaɪ.əm/ or /ˈkoʊniəm/) is a genus of flowering plants in the family Apiaceae. As of December 2020, Plants of the World Online accepts six species.

All species of the genus are poisonous to humans. C. maculatum, also known as hemlock, is infamous for being highly poisonous. Hemlock is native to temperate regions of Europe, North Africa and Western Asia. The species C. chaerophylloides, C. fontanum, and C. sphaerocarpum are all native to southern Africa.

== Description ==
Plants of the genus Conium are eudicots, flowering plants distinguished by their two cotyledons (embryonic leaves) and tricolpate (three-pored) pollen. They are typically biennial, forming basal rosettes in the first year of growth, and sprouting a rigid, hollow flower stalk in the second. Germination occurs between spring and autumn. Occasionally, plants which germinate in early spring are annual instead of biennial. These plants grow best in wet, poorly drained areas with nutrient rich soil. They grow well in nitrogen rich soil, and are able to tolerate high levels of heavy metals, such as arsenic, cadmium, and lead. Conium plants are diploid, with a chromosome number of 2n = 22 (haploid number 11). They grow from one to three meters tall, varying between species. They produce hermaphroditic flowers, which are typically insect pollinated or self-fertilized.

=== Stems ===
Conium plants are herbaceous, growing non-woody, hollow, and hairless stems. Generally, the stem is striated and light green; however, the coloring varies by species and variety. Some express purple blotching throughout, some have purple blotching localized near the base, and others have no markings at all.

=== Leaves ===
The alternate leaves are pinnately compound and finely divided, with the exact pinnation patterns varying between species and leaf type. For example, stem leaves of C. maculatum plants are typically 2–4 pinnate, but basal leaves are 1–3 pinnate. The leaves and petioles are light green. Similar to the stem coloring, some species and varieties express purple blotching on the leaves and petioles.

=== Flowers ===
Terminal inflorescences are made up of many small flowers, colored white, yellow, or green depending on the species. The flowers are grouped together in umbrella shaped umbels. Plants in the genus Conium have compound umbels, with multiple dome shaped clusters branching out from a central point. Flowers are around 2 mm across, and the umbrella shaped umbels range 1–8 cm (0.39–3.1 in) in diameter.

==== Fruits ====
The two seeded fruit is one of the most significant distinguishing factors between species. They are relatively round, slightly flattened, and dark green or brown. Depending on the species, they range from 2.5 to 4 mm long. Some species have distinctive light brown ribs, some have ribs that are noticeably crenulate (scalloped edges), and others show relatively unpronounced rib patterns.

==== Seeds ====
Each plant typically produces between 1,700 and 39,000 seeds, and 40-85% will germinate in suitable conditions. However, seeds will remain viable for 3 to 6 years after dispersal. Producing a large number of seeds, and growing in a variety of locations, these plants can be considered invasive in some cases.

=== Chemical composition ===
Poisonous alkaloid compounds are present in all tissues of Conium plants. As a flower develops into a fruit and matures, the alkaloids present transform from γ-coniceine, to coniine, and finally to N-methylconiine. When ingested, these compounds interrupt the central nervous system, paralyzing respiratory muscles, and finally resulting in death through respiratory failure.

=== Species differentiation from other plants ===
Members of the genus Conium can be easily confused with edible plants of the family Apiaceae. Conium plants have leaves similar to parsley (Petroselinum crispum) and roots similar to parsnip (Pastinaca sativa). However, a few characteristics can be used to distinguish the poisonous Conium plants from other harmless Apiaceae plants. For example, Conium leaves and stems release a foul odor when crushed. Additionally, the species C. maculatum stands out with its purple blotching pattern.

== Taxonomy ==
The genus name "Conium" references the Greek word koneios for 'spin' or 'whirl', alluding to the dizzying effects of the plant's poison after ingestion. In the vernacular, "hemlock" most commonly refers to the species C. maculatum, but it also refers to Cicuta species (water hemlock), where both species are similar in physical features, and both are highly toxic.

The genus Conium was erected by Carl Linnaeus in 1753. Several botanists, such as J.F.M. Cannon, G.H. Leute, and J.H. Ross, have historically made the argument that southern African species of Conium has few significant distinctions. Some even claim that the genus has no independent species at all. They argue that the populations in southern Africa "may be the result of the chance introduction of a few individuals which represented genetically a very limited range of the total variability of the species." Some believe that each species of Conium is synonymous to C. maculatum. Others believe that there are two to three distinct southern African species of Conium.

=== History ===
Conium was known to ancient Greeks, who used it for its narcotic properties and in capital punishment. It was the method used to execute Theramenes and the means by which Socrates took his own life.

Conium maculatum, also known as poison hemlock, was first described by Carl Linnaeus in his 1753 publication, Species Plantarum. It was the first described species within the genus. "Maculatum" means spotted, referencing the purple blotches characteristic of this species.

Conium chaerophylloides was described by Danish plant collector Christian Friedrich Ecklon (1795–1868) and German botanist Karl Ludwig Philipp Zeyher. In 1828, they came together in South Africa, forming a partnership. For the next decade, they built their collection, describing almost 2000 genera and species.

Both C. fontanum and C. sphaerocarpum were described by South African botanist Olive Mary Hilliard and English botanist Brian Laurence Burtt. Together, they published their classifications in the South African Journal of Botany in 1985.

=== Species ===
As of December 2020, Plants of the World Online accepts six species:

- Conium chaerophylloides (Thunb.) Eckl. & Zeyh.
- Conium divaricatum Boiss. & Orph.
- Conium fontanum Hilliard & B.L.Burtt
- Conium hilliburttorum Magee & V.R.Clark
- Conium maculatum L.
- Conium sphaerocarpum Hilliard & B.L.Burtt

==== Conium chaerophylloides ====
Conium chaerophylloides, growing two to three meters tall, can be distinguished by its unique yellow-green flowers. Groups of many of these small flowers make up obconical umbels. The outer rays (individual flowers) form an angle with the point of attachment, giving the umbel a cone-like shape, which fans out from the base of the inflorescence. They produce round, 4 mm long, dark brown or green fruit, with deep, lightly colored ridges.

==== Conium fontanum ====
Conium fontanum expresses a similar obconical umbel arrangement, but produces slightly larger fruit, and develops the white flowers characteristic of the other species in the Conium genus. The fruit is usually larger than 4 mm long, with ridges of the same dark green or brown color as the rest of the ovary. These plants grow one to three meters tall, depending on the variety.

==== Conium hilliburttorum ====
Conium hilliburttorum has not always been recognized as a distinct species within the genus. Like C. sphaerocarpum, these plants have white flowers grouped in hemispherical umbels and small fruit. However, these researchers argue that the fruit and ovary anatomy significantly distinguish them from C. sphaerocarpum. They develop similar sized fruit; however, C. hilliburttorum fruit displays prominent ribs, whereas C. sphaerocarpum fruit is relatively smooth. C. hilliburttorum ovaries are covered in tubercules, or small lumpy outgrowths, like C. chaerophylloides fruit. However, C. chaerophylloides plants have yellow or green flowers, and they grow much larger fruit and are much taller.

==== Conium maculatum ====
Conium maculatum is distinguished by red or purple blotching along the hairless green stem. Some varieties of the southern African species express a moderate degree of blotching at the base of the stem, but most are simply green. It grows white flowers in umbrella-shaped clusters.

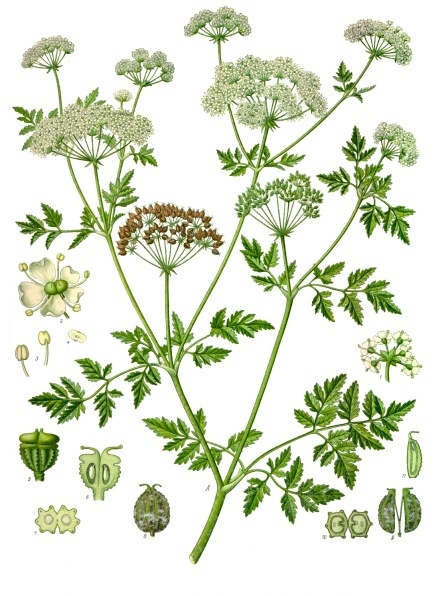
19th-century illustration of Conium maculatum (from Köhler's Medicinal Plants)

==== Conium sphaerocarpum ====
Conium sphaerocarpum produces similarly colored, but slightly smaller fruit, less than 3.5 mm long. The ovary is relatively smooth, with almost completely flat, inconspicuous ridges. Additionally, the small white flowers are arranged in hemispherical umbels. Each umbel's outer rays protrude horizontally, forming a semi-sphere shape, with the flat edge at the base of the umbel, and the dome pointing away from the point of attachment. This species tends to grow shorter than others within the genus.

== Evolution ==
Conium is a genus within the family Apiaceae. The family Apiaceae originates from Australasia in the Late Cretaceous period. Conium is specifically part of the Apioideae subfamily which split off from the other subfamilies of Apiaceae between 45.9 and 71.2 million years ago in southern Africa.

=== Toxin development ===
The evolution of toxicity within Conium plants and within Apiaceae plants has several theories. Apiaceae plants contain secondary compounds which are compounds that are often limited to just a family, genus, or a species of plant that varies among those smaller groups and is unlikely to be essential to the day-to-day physiological needs of the plant. These secondary compounds are used to mediate the plants interactions with other organisms, such as the prevention of herbivory. Gottfried S. Fraenkel in 1959 called the distribution of secondary compounds within Apiaceae and other families reciprocal adaptive evolution. Ehrlich and Raven in 1964 called Fraenkel's process coevolution. They claimed that secondary compounds diversify by emerging as a novel compound that protects a plant from herbivory. Due to this protection from herbivory and mutation or recombination in an insect, the plant can become susceptible to herbivory once more if an insect evolves the means to detoxify or tolerate the toxin created by the secondary compound. With this new trait, the insect has a new adaptive zone with which it can diversify and the plant has a certain set of adapted herbivores. This is seen with Conium, where C. maculatum has an adaptive herbivore, Agonopterix alstromeriana.

== Distribution ==
Conium maculatum is native to northern Europe, western Asia, and North Africa. C. chaerophylloides, C. fontanum, and C. sphaerocarpum are all native to southern Africa.

Conium maculatum has been introduced to the Americas, southern Africa, China, New Zealand, and Australia. It was originally brought to the United States from Europe as a garden plant. C. maculatum has been introduced to other parts of the world due to the transportation of grain. In many areas which C. maculatum has been introduced, it has become an invasive species.

== Ecology ==
All species of Conium are poisonous to humans and several other species of mammals; yet, some serve as food sources for some insects. In addition, the invasiveness of Conium species into non-native habitats is documented. It is unknown what the spread of Conium into new environments is primarily driven by.

=== Dispersal ===
Seeds of the Conium plants fall close to the parent and primarily rely on abiotic and biotic vector transmissions for dispersal. For biotic transmissions, rodents and birds have been documented to spread seeds, with them clinging to the animals' fur. Human introductions of the plants from their native into new habitats (either accidentally through seed contamination or intentional as a garden plant or medicinal herb) is also a proposed cause of the plant being invasive in several regions, but these are not common.

=== Ecological relationships ===
As a weed, Conium plants can spread into grasslands and other areas with low vegetation and crowd out local grass species. The plants spread very quickly and are very competitive with native grasses.

Conium plants use their toxicity as a way to mediate their ecological interactions with other species. Despite the Conium plants being poisonous, several invertebrates and some insects have evolved mechanisms for avoiding toxicity of chemicals when feeding on the plants. One species of moth, Agonopterix alstroemeriana, infests C. maculatum.

The plants serve as a host for several viruses, bacteria, and insects, including the carrot rust fly, Psila rosae; the bacterium Xylella fastidiosa; carrot thin leaf virus; celery mosaic virus; and alfalfa mosaic virus. In 2015, a novel Poison Hemlock Virus Y (PHVY) was isolated from leaf samples of C. maculatum with mild mosaic and vein yellowing symptoms, collected from fields in south-east Iran. The virus was shown serologically to be related to potyviruses.

=== Economic impact ===
Conium plants are poisonous to a variety of animals including cows, sheep, goats, swine, rabbits, elk, poultry, and humans. Some of the impacts of the consumption of these plants on animals include muscle spasms, diarrhea, depression, skeletal malformations, and death. In fact, the most important losses from Conium plants is through livestock toxicity. An estimated yearly loss of livestock to these plants in the western US was $340 million.

Although they are mostly found in non-crop fields, Conium plants compete with commercial agricultural plants, including several types of vegetables and grains. It has been found growing in corn, chickpea, vegetable, and orchard fields. Regions affected include Oceania, the Iberian peninsula, central Europe, and the United States. Economic losses of crops due to Conium invasion is not as widespread or severe as its affecting of animals farms, and there is little crop loss data available from those regions.

== Uses ==
Historically, the leaves and flowers of Conium plant species were prized for their decorative appearance, and they were bred and kept as ornamental decorative plants. Conium plants were also used as natural barriers and in medicine as treatments. As knowledge that chemicals produced by Conium plants were toxic to humans and mammals became widespread, their usage as decorative plants and as treatments have declined.

Today, species of the Conium genus have no known uses, and they are classified as a weed. However, notably, C. maculatum continues to be used in medicine as an ingredient. In addition, the production of toxic chemicals that have limited their widespread public use has instigated research in the chemicals' potential applications in agriculture.

=== Pesticides ===
Chemicals produced by and isolated from plants of this genus were found to have anti-insect and anti-predator properties and have been studied for use in agriculture. Coniine was proven to be effective against aphids and blowflies. In addition, extracts of Conium plants were found to inhibit Fusarium pallidoroseum, a fungal disease causing twig blight in mulberry. However, these findings have not yet been implemented in practice.

=== In medicine ===
Extracts of Conium plants were used as sedatives and antispasmodics. Because of the plants' toxicities, uses as a medicine were discontinued by the early 20th century.

Today, there are no accepted uses for the Conium genus plants as a treatment. Despite severe safety concerns and a lack of supporting scientific evidence, C. maculatum has continued to be used as homeopathy or home remedy treatment for several medical conditions including anxiety, muscle spasms, bronchitis, whooping cough, asthma, and arthritis. There is little information on the plant's interactions with other drugs and on treatment doses.

=== Other uses ===
Conium maculatum was introduced into North America as an ornamental plant, imported into the United States and southern Canada. Plant hobbyists continue to cultivate this plant species today.

As plants of the Conium species are known to be dangerous to mammals, they are also used as natural fences between tracts of land to block predatory animals such as wolves. It is grown along streams or rivers and near fences and pastures.

== Toxicity ==
All species of Conium are highly toxic to humans, many other mammals, and birds (in larger doses). Virtually all parts of the plant are poisonous to humans, and consumption of any part of the plant can cause poisoning. In most cases, poisoning occurs from a misidentification of the plant as an edible species, such as C. maculatum root with wild parsnips or its leaves with parsley.

=== Effects on humans and other animals ===
Conium maculatum is especially known to be dangerous to pregnant and breast-feeding females and in children, where poisoning has occurred by consuming small amounts of C. maculatum. An overdose of Conium maculatum can typically produce paralysis, with a toxic dose causing loss of speech followed by inhibited respiratory function and, later, death. This plant species and others in the Conium genus are also toxic in larger mammals, including cattle, horses, and other domestic animals. They are also known to cause birth defects in domesticated animals. Birds do not appear to be affected as severely when consuming these seeds of these plants, but they can also be poisoned in larger doses.

=== Pharmacology ===
In hemlock, eight piperidine alkaloids, known to cause strong physiological effects, were isolated. Two of the eight compounds, g-coniceine and coniine, were measured as having the highest concentration, and they contribute to the plant's toxicity. Other alkaloids that have been identified in hemlock include methyl coniine, ethyl piperidine and pseudoconhydrine.

In larger animals, acute toxicity doses for C. maculatum are lower for pigs compared to cattle, and for sheep compared to goats. Specifically, toxicity doses are 3.3 mg/kg for cattle, 15.5 mg/kg for horses and 44.0 mg/kg for sheep.

=== Treatment ===
Gastric lavage is performed on larger animals who have consumed Conium plants. For animals who have started to show symptoms, support respiration and treatment with activated charcoal and a saline cathartic are used. Support respiration and activated charcoal treatment is also given to human patients who have ingested Conium plants.

=== As a poison ===
The Greek philosopher Socrates famously died by goading a jury into sentencing him to death by hemlock (see Plato's Apology.) Conium maculatum (poison hemlock) is infamous in its use as a poison. A small overdose of extract of the plant causes paralysis with higher toxic doses causing a ceasing of respiratory function followed by death. Poison hemlock was historically used in official executions and assassinations.

== Cultivation ==
Historically, Conium species has been grown as ornamental plants. As it has attractive flowers to some plant breeders, it was introduced to the US from Europe as a garden plant. However, there have been documented cases where there was an improper cultivation of plants, where the species, notably C. maculatum, is mistaken with common edible plants such as parsnip, parsley, wild celery, and anise and is farmed for human consumption accidentally.

Today, intentional introduction of Conium plants as a garden plant or live specimen for herbal medicine into new and existing regions is less likely.

== Notes ==
^{1} Species names have Conium abbreviated as C. followed by the species taxonomy.
