= Conhydrine =

- Conhydrine

Names
- Preferred IUPAC name (1R)-1-[(2S)-Piperidin-2-yl]propan-1-ol

Identifiers
CAS Number	495-20-5
3D model (JSmol)	Interactive image
ChemSpider	9919452
ECHA InfoCard	100.007.090
EC Number	207-798-1
PubChem CID	10314
UNII	Q21EOC14Q2
CompTox Dashboard (EPA)	DTXSID10879264
- InChI: InChI=1S/C8H17NO/c1-2-8(10)7-5-3-4-6-9-7/h7-10H,2-6H2,1H3/t7-,8+/m0/s1 Key: VCCAAURNBULZRR-JGVFFNPUSA-N
- SMILES: O[C@H](CC)[C@H]1NCCCC1

Properties
Chemical formula	C_{8}H_{17}NO
Molar mass	143.230 g·mol^{−1}
Melting point	121 °C (250 °F; 394 K)
Boiling point	226 °C (439 °F; 499 K)
Solubility in water	moderate
Solubility in ethanol	good
Solubility in chloroform	good
Solubility in diethylether	moderate
Chiral rotation ([α]_{D})	+10° (natural)
- Except where otherwise noted, data are given for materials in their standard state (at 25 °C [77 °F], 100 kPa). verify (what is ?) Infobox references

Conhydrine is a poisonous alkaloid found in poison hemlock (Conium maculatum) in small quantities.

== Isolation and properties ==
This oxygenated alkaloid was isolated by Wertheim from C. maculatum. It crystallises in colourless leaflets, has a coniine-like odour, can be sublimed, and is strongly basic. It crystallises readily from ether. The salts are crystalline; the aurichloride small rhombs or prisms, mp. 133 °C; the benzoyl derivative mp. 132 °C.

=== Constitution ===
On oxidation with chromic acid, conhydrine yields L-piperidyl-2-carboxylic acid. It is converted into L-coniine either by reduction of the iodo-derivative (iodoconiine), C_{8}H_{16}IN, formed by the action of hydriodic acid and phosphorus at 180 °C or by hydrogenation of the mixture of coniceines produced, when it is dehydrated by phosphorus pentoxide in toluene.

These and other observations indicate that the oxygen atom must occur as a hydroxyl group, in the n-propyl side chain in either the α- or β-position, since the γ-position would involve the production of piperidyl-2-propionic acid on oxidation. 2-β-Hydroxypropyl-piperidine suggested by Willstätter seemed to be excluded, since neither of the two forms of this product prepared by Löffler and Tschunke resembled conhydrine, and these authors suggested the α-position as probably representing the alkaloid. Support for this view was provided by Hess and coworkers , who showed that DL--N-methylconhydrone is N-methyl-2-piperidyl ethyl ketone, that DL-conhydrine (mp. 69–70 °C), produced by a somewhat indirect method, is identical with the product, mp. 69.5–71.5 °C, prepared by Engler and Bauer by the reduction with sodium in ethyl alcohol of 2-pyridyl ethyl ketone, and that conhydrine on dehydrogenation over platinum or palladium asbestos gives rise to a mixture of tetrahydropyridyl 2-ethyl ketone and 2-α-hydroxypropyl-pyridine. Späth and Adler have shown that conhydrine can be degraded in two stages by exhaustive methylation to trimethylamine, and a mixture of two products, an oil, C_{8}H_{14}O, bp. 157–159 °C@744 mmHg, and a crystalline substance, C_{8}H_{16}O_{2}, mp. 75–76 °C. The oil, when heated with water at 170 °C is converted, by addition of a molecule of water, into the crystalline substance. The latter contains two active hydrogen atoms (Zerewitinoff estimation), and on exposure to hydrogen over Pd/C absorbs enough to saturate one double bond producing a new substance, mp. 94–96 °C. On oxidation with permanganate in dilute sulfuric acid, propionaldehyde and succinic acid are produced, whilst the saturated substance, mp. 94–96 °C, is oxidised to n-valeric acid. These results indicate that the substance of mp. 75–76 °C is εζ-dihydroxy-Δ^{α}-n-octene, that the oil, C_{8}H_{14}O, is the corresponding oxide, and that the representation of conhydrine as 2-α-hydroxypropyl-pyridine accounts for their production.
