= Römpp's Chemistry Lexicon =

Chemical encyclopedia from Germany

Römpp's Chemistry Lexicon (German Römpp Lexikon Chemie) is a chemical encyclopedia from Germany. Started by chemistry teacher Hermann Römpp in 1947 it has evolved to the leading chemical encyclopedia in German language. Römpp's Chemistry Lexicon contains around 64,000 entries and 215,000 links.

== History ==
After the first five editions by Hermann Römpp, Erhard Ühlein took over editorship in 1964. He died shortly after publishing the 6th edition. The 7th and 8th edition were edited by Otto-Albrecht Neumüller.

In 1988, Römpp's Chemistry Lexicon was transferred to Thieme Medical Publishers, with editorship handled by a team of authors. The 9th edition and 10th edition, the final two print editions, were published in 1992 and 1999, respectively.

Since 2002 the Römpp is published online as a web encyclopedia.

== Spin-offs ==
The editorial team has created several spinoffs, e.g. the Römpp Encyclopedia Natural Products (2000) and volumes about biotechnology & genetics, environment, food chemistry, and paint & varnish.
