= Coniine =

- (S)-Coniine

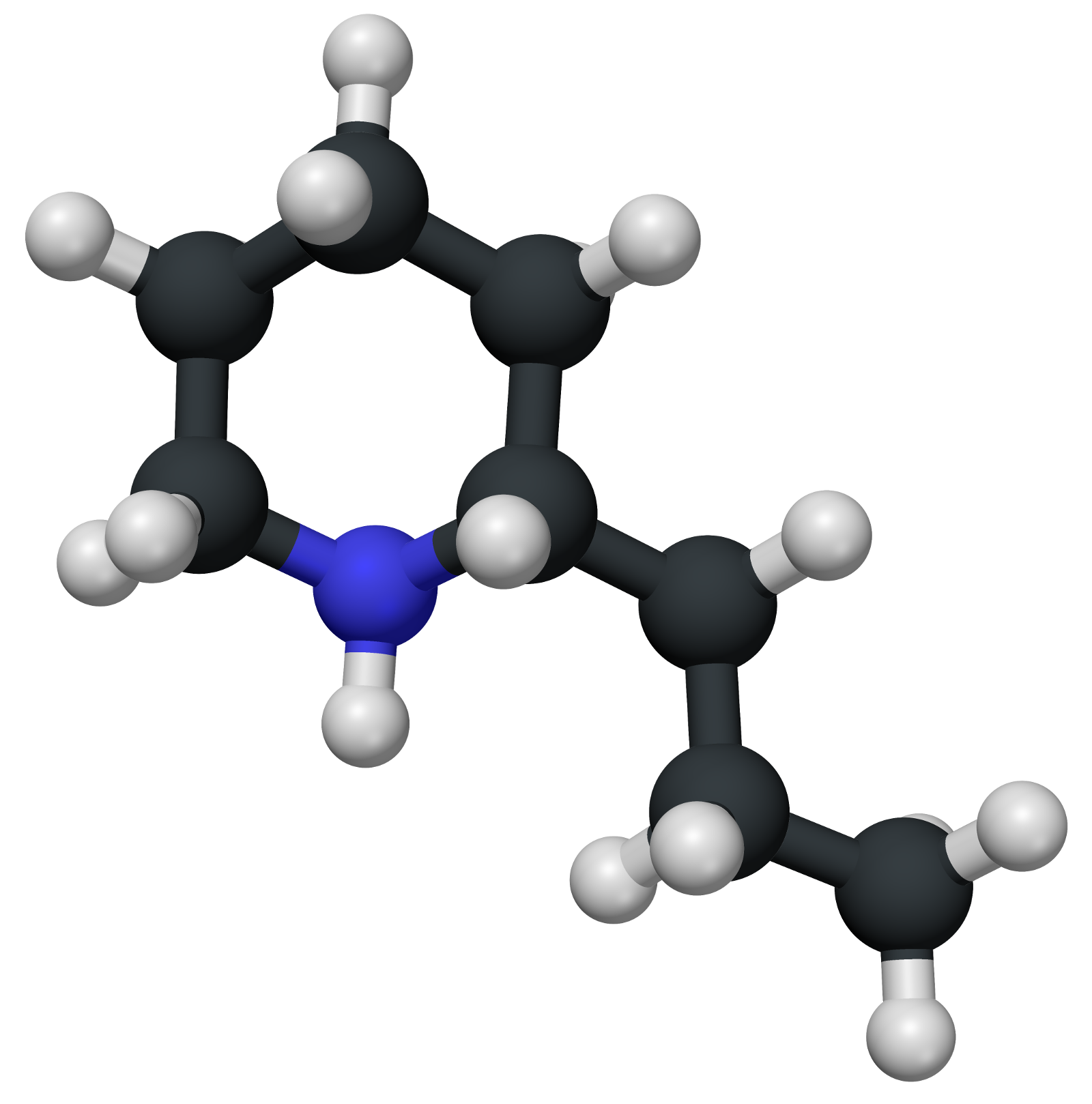

Names
- IUPAC name (2S)-2-Propylpiperidine

Identifiers
CAS Number	(R/S): 3238-60-6; (R): 5985-99-9; (S): 458-88-8
3D model (JSmol)	(R/S): Interactive image; (R): Interactive image; (S): Interactive image
ChEBI	(R/S): CHEBI:28322
ChEMBL	(S): ChEMBL2287063
ChemSpider	(R/S): 389878
ECHA InfoCard	100.006.621
EC Number	(S): 207-282-6
KEGG	(R/S): C06523
PubChem CID	(R/S): 9985; (S): 441072
UNII	(R/S): C479P32L2D; (R): 04R53ZF48T; (S): QKK1SI92BR
CompTox Dashboard (EPA)	(R/S): DTXSID8041795
- InChI: InChI=1S/C8H17N/c1-2-5-8-6-3-4-7-9-8/h8-9H,2-7H2,1H3/t8-/m0/s1 Key: NDNUANOUGZGEPO-QMMMGPOBSA-N; (R/S): InChI=1/C8H17N/c1-2-5-8-6-3-4-7-9-8/h8-9H,2-7H2,1H3/t8-/m0/s1 Key: NDNUANOUGZGEPO-QMMMGPOBBO
- SMILES: (R/S): CCCC1CCCCN1; (R): N1[C@@H](CCC)CCCC1; (S): N1[C@H](CCC)CCCC1

Properties
Chemical formula	C_{8}H_{17}N
Molar mass	127.231 g·mol^{−1}
Appearance	Colorless, oily liquid
Melting point	−2 °C (28 °F; 271 K)
Boiling point	166 to 167 °C (331 to 333 °F; 439 to 440 K)
Refractive index (n_{D})	1.4505

Hazards
- GHS labelling
Pictograms	(GHS02: Flammable) (GHS06: Toxic) (GHS08: Health hazard)
Signal word	Danger
Hazard statements	H226, H301, H311, H331, H351
Precautionary statements	P203, P210, P233, P240, P241, P242, P243, P261, P262, P264, P270, P271, P280, P301+P316, P302+P352, P303+P361+P353, P304+P340, P316, P318, P321, P330, P361+P364, P370+P378, P403+P233, P403+P235, P405, P501
- Except where otherwise noted, data are given for materials in their standard state (at 25 °C [77 °F], 100 kPa). verify (what is ?) Infobox references

Coniine is a poisonous chemical compound, an alkaloid present in and isolable from poison hemlock (Conium maculatum), where its presence has been a source of significant economic, medical, and historico-cultural interest; coniine is also produced by the yellow pitcher plant (Sarracenia flava), and fool's parsley (Aethusa cynapium). Its ingestion and extended exposure are toxic to humans and all classes of livestock; its mechanism of poisoning involves disruption of the central nervous system, with death caused by respiratory paralysis. The biosynthesis of coniine contains as its penultimate step the non-enzymatic cyclisation of 5-oxooctylamine to γ-coniceine, a Schiff base differing from coniine only by its carbon-nitrogen double bond in the ring. This pathway results in natural coniine that is a mixture—a racemate—composed of two enantiomers, the stereoisomers (S)-(+)-coniine and (R)-(−)-coniine, depending on the direction taken by the chain that branches from the ring. Both enantiomers are toxic, with the (R)-enantiomer being the more biologically active and toxic of the two in general. Coniine holds a place in organic chemistry history as being the first of the important class of alkaloids to be synthesized, by Albert Ladenburg in 1886, and it has been synthesized in the laboratory in a number of unique ways through to modern times.

Hemlock poisoning has been a periodic human concern, a regular veterinary concern, and has had significant occurrences in human and cultural history. Notably, in 399 BC, Socrates was sentenced to death by drinking a coniine-containing mixture of poison hemlock.

== Natural origins ==
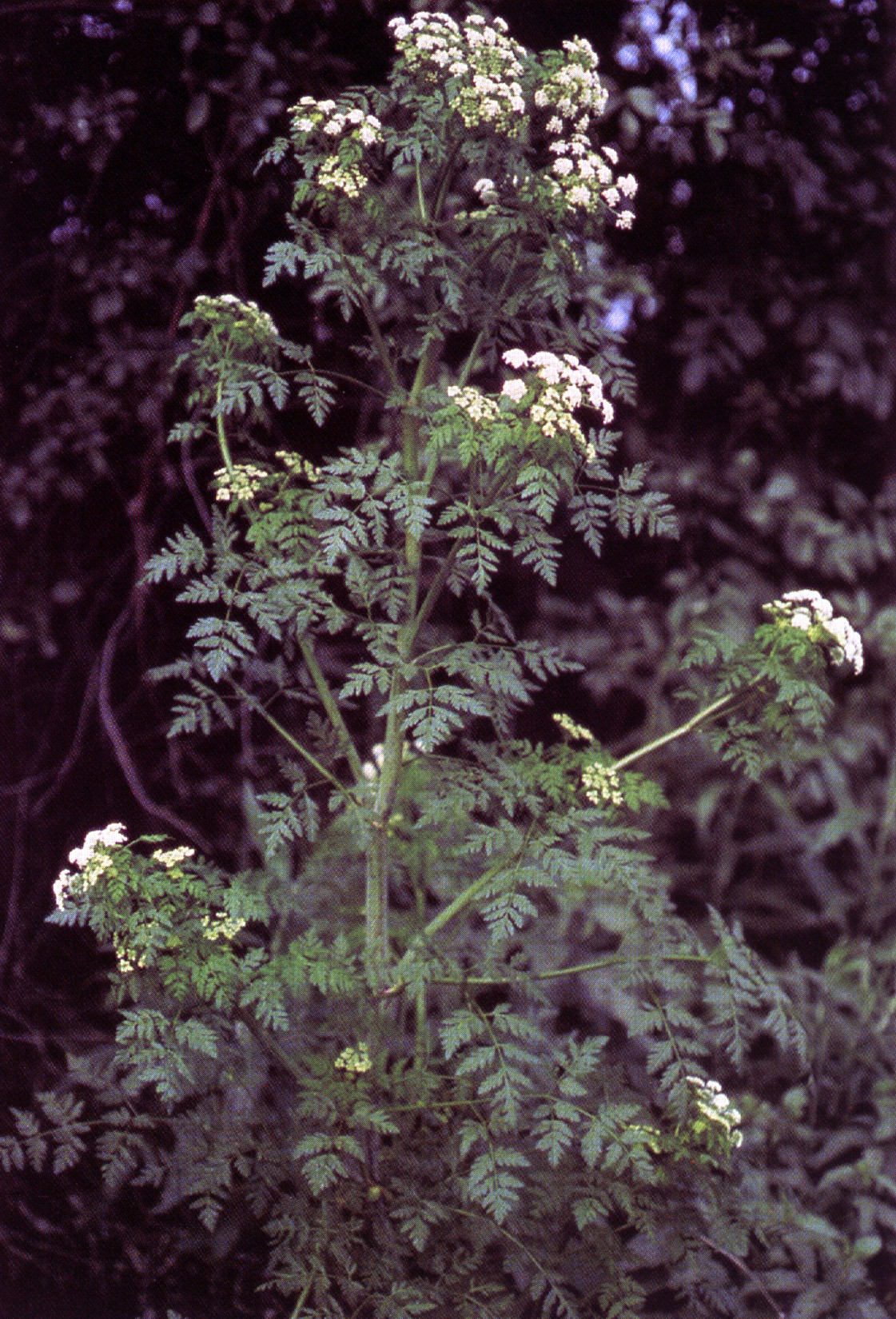
The poison hemlock plant.

Poison hemlock (Conium maculatum) contains highly toxic amounts of coniine. Its presence on farmland is an issue for livestock farmers because animals will eat it if they are not well fed or the hemlock is mixed in with pasture grass. The coniine is present in Conium maculatum as a mixture of the R-(−)- and S-(+)-enantiomers.

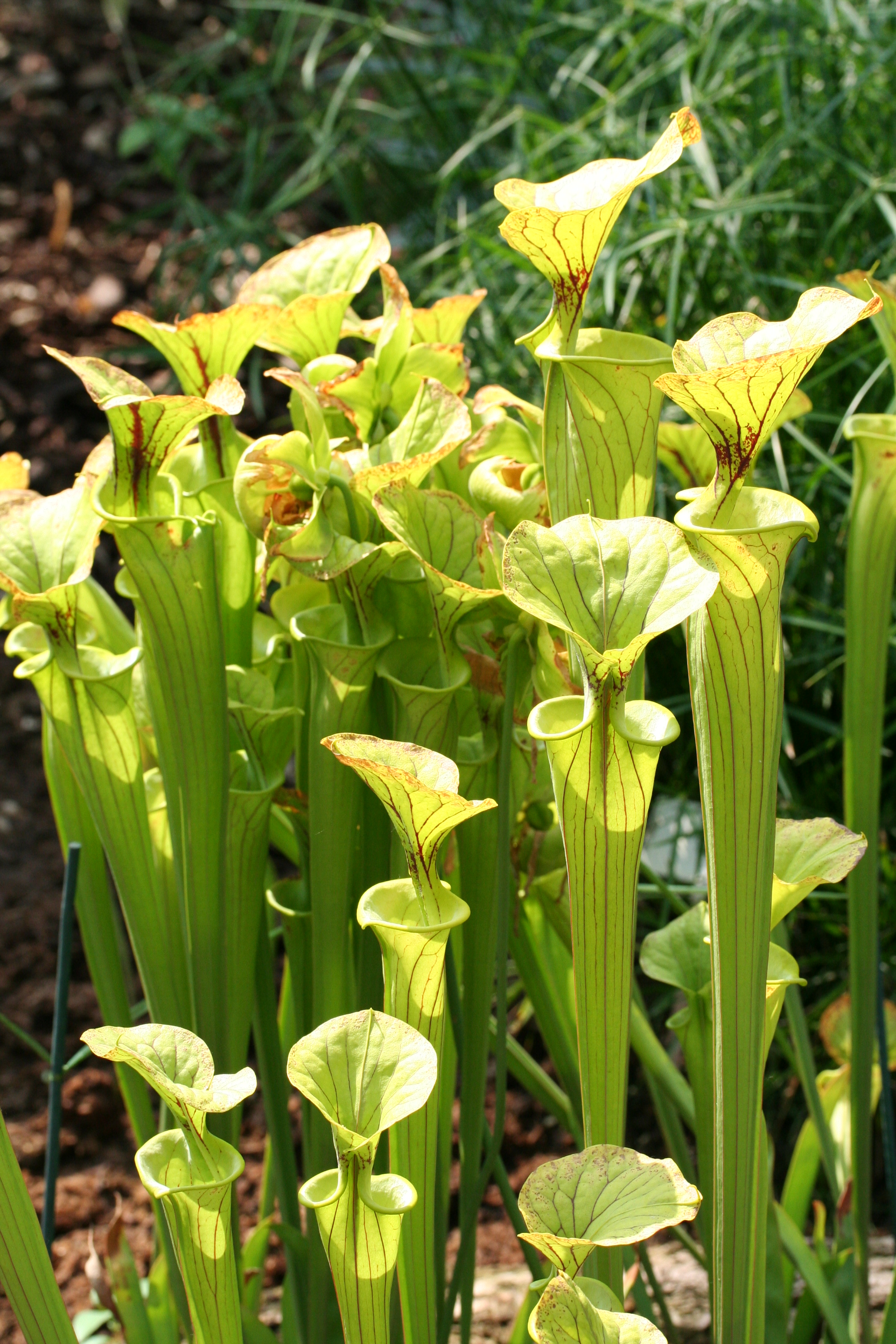
The yellow pitcher plant

Coniine is also found in Sarracenia flava, the yellow pitcher plant. The yellow pitcher plant is a carnivorous plant endemic to the southeastern United States. The plant uses a mixture of sugar and coniine to simultaneously attract and poison insects, which then fall into a digestive tube. Coniine is also found in Aethusa cynapium, commonly known as fool's parsley.

== History of natural isolates ==
The history of coniine is understandably tied to the poison hemlock plant, since the natural product was not synthesizable until the 1880s. Jews in the Middle East were poisoned by coniine after consuming quail in the area that usually ate hemlock seeds, and Greeks on the island of Lesbos who also consumed quail suffered from the same poisoning, causing myoglobinuria and acute kidney injury. This condition is called coturnism. Though some doubt the hypothesis. The most famous hemlock poisoning occurred in 399 BCE, when the philosopher Socrates is believed to have consumed a liquid infused with hemlock to carry out his death sentence, having been convicted of impiety toward the gods, and the corruption of youth. Hemlock juice was often used to execute criminals in ancient Greece.

Hemlock has had a limited medical use throughout history. The Greeks used it not just as capital punishment, but also as an antispasmodic and treatment for arthritis. Books from the 10th century attest to medical use by the Anglo-Saxons. In the Middle Ages it was believed that hemlock could be used to cure rabies; in later European times it came to be associated with flying ointments in witchcraft. Native Americans used hemlock extract as arrow poison.

Yellow pitcher plant, or Sarracenia flava, contains coniine. Aethusa cynapium contains cynopine, which is similar to coniine.

== Pharmacology and toxicology ==
The (R)-(−) enantiomer of coniine is the more biologically active, at least in one system (TE-671 cells expressing human fetal nicotinic neuromuscular receptors), and in mouse bioassay, the same enantiomer and the racemic mixture are about two-fold more toxic than the (S)-(+) enantiomer (see below).

Coniine, as racemate or as pure enantiomer, begins by binding and stimulating the nicotinic receptor on the post-synaptic membrane of the neuromuscular junction. The subsequent depolarization results in nicotinic toxicity; as coniine stays bound to the receptor, the nerve stays depolarized, inactivating it. This results, systemically, in a flaccid paralysis, an action similar to that of succinylcholine since they are both depolarizing neuromuscular blockers. Symptoms of paralysis generally occur within half an hour, although death may take several hours. The central nervous system is not affected: the person remains conscious and aware until respiratory paralysis results in cessation of breathing. The flaccid, muscular paralysis is an ascending paralysis, lower limbs being first affected. The person may have a hypoxic convulsion just prior to death, disguised by the muscular paralysis such that the person may just weakly shudder. Cause of death is lack of oxygen to the brain and heart as a consequence of respiratory paralysis, so that a poisoned person may recover if artificial ventilation can be maintained until the toxin is removed from the victim's system.

The LD_{50} values (in mouse, i.v. administered) for the R-(−) and S-(+) enantiomers, and the racemate, are approximately 7 and 12, and 8 milligrams per kilogram, respectively.

== Chemical properties ==
(+/–)-Coniine was first isolated by Giesecke, but the formula was suggested by Blyth and definitely established by Hofmann.

D-(S)-Coniine has since been determined to be a colorless alkaline liquid, with a penetrating odour and a burning taste; has D^{0°} 0.8626 and D^{19°} 0.8438, refractive index n^{23°}_{D} 1.4505, and is dextrorotatory, [α]^{19°}_{D} +15.7° (see related comments under Specific rotation section below). L-(R)-Coniine has [α]^{21°}_{D} 15° and in other respects resembles its D-isomer, but the salts have slightly different melting points; the platinichloride has mp. 160 °C (Löffler and Friedrich report 175 °C), the aurichloride mp. 59 °C.

=== Solubility ===
Coniine is slightly soluble (1 in 90) in cold water, less so in hot water, so that a clear cold solution becomes turbid when warmed. On the other hand, the base dissolves about 25% of water at room temperature. It mixes with alcohol in all proportions, is readily soluble in ether and most organic solvents. Coniine dissolves in carbon disulfide, forming a complex thiocarbamate.

=== Crystallization ===
Coniine solidifies into a soft crystalline mass at −2 °C. It slowly oxidizes in the air. The salts crystallize well and are soluble in water or alcohol. The hydrochloride, B•HCl, crystallizes from water in rhombs, mp. 220 °C, [α]^{20°}_{D} +10.1°; the hydrobromide, in needles, mp. 211 °C, and the D-acid tartrate, B•C_{4}H_{6}O_{6}•2 H_{2}O, in rhombic crystals, mp. 54 °C. The platinichloride, (B•HCl)_{2}•PtCl_{4}•H_{2}O, separates from concentrated solution as an oil, which solidifies to a mass of orange-yellow crystals, mp. 175 °C (dry). The aurichloride, B•HAuCl_{4}, crystallizes on standing, mp. 77 °C. The picrate forms small yellow needles, mp. 75 °C, from hot water. The 2,4-dinitrobenzoyl- and 3,5-dinitrobenzoyl-derivates have mps. 139.0–139.5 °C and 108–9 °C respectively. The precipitate afforded by potassium cadmium iodide solution is crystalline, mp. 118 °C, while that given by nicotine with this reagent is amorphous.

=== Color changes ===
Coniine gives no coloration with sulfuric or nitric acid. Sodium nitroprusside gives a deep red color, which disappears on warming, but reappears on cooling, and is changed to blue or violet by aldehydes.

=== Specific rotation ===
The stereochemical composition of "coniine" is a matter of some importance, since its two enantiomers do not have identical biological properties, and many of the older pharmacological studies on this compound were carried out using the naturally occurring isomeric mixture. S-(+)-Coniine has a specific rotation, [α]_{D}, of +8.4° (c = 4.0, in CHCl_{3}). These authors note that Ladenburg's value, +15°, is for a "neat", i.e. undiluted, sample. A similarly high value of +16° for the [α]_{D} of "coniine" is given, without explicit citation of the source, in The Merck Index. The value of +7.7° (c = 4.0, CHCl_{3}) for synthetic S-(+)-coniine and -7.9° (c = 0.5, CHCl_{3}) for synthetic R-(−)-coniine is given by other chemists. The hydrochloride salts of the (S)-(+) and (R)-(−) enantiomers of coniine have values of [α]_{D} of +4.6° and -5.2°, respectively (c = 0.5, in methanol).

== Synthesis ==
The original synthesis (shown below) of Coniine was performed by Ladenburg in 1886. Ladenburg heated N-methylpyridine iodide to 250 °C, to obtain 2-methylpyridine. He then performed a Knoevenagel condensation with acetaldehyde in anhydrous zinc chloride to yield 2-propenylpyridine. In fact, Ladenburg used paraldehyde, a cyclic trimer of acetaldehyde that readily forms acetaldehyde upon heating. Finally, 2-propenylpyridine was reduced with metallic sodium in ethanol to provide racemic (±) coniine. Fractional crystallisation of racemic coniine with (+)-tartaric acid yielded enantiopure coniine.

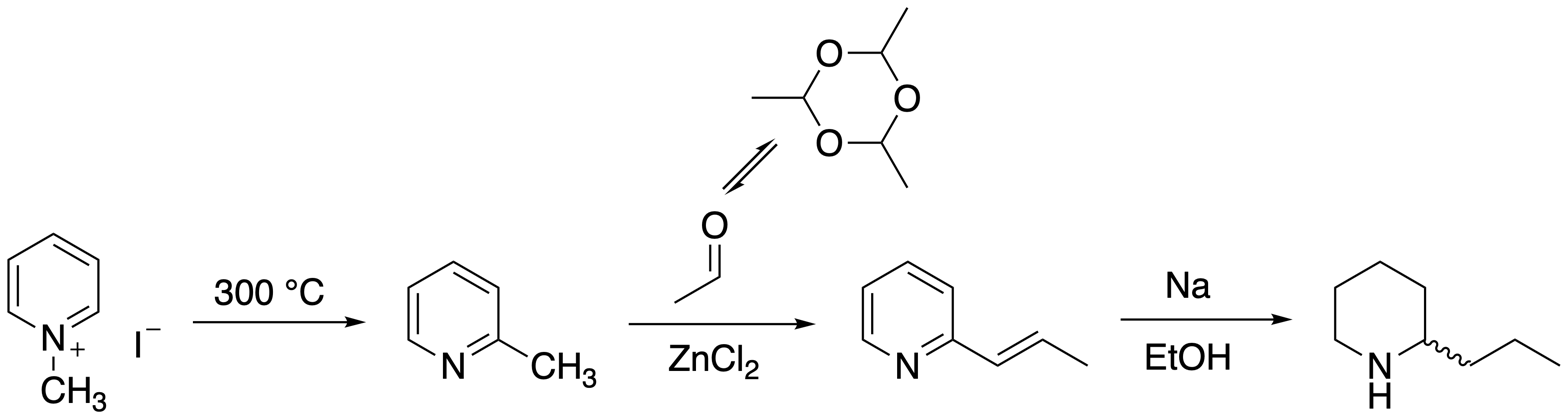
Original Synthesis by Ladenburg

The scheme proposed by Ladenburg gave poor yields, so the quest for alternative routes was open. A slightly better yield is observed if 2-methylpyridine and acetaldehyde are heated in a sealed tube with hydrochloric acid for 10 hours. A mixture of 2-propenylpyridine and 2-chloropropylpyridine is formed and is subsequently reduced by sodium in ethanol to give rac-coniine. Note: although the scheme below shows a single enantiomer of coniine, the final reaction produces a racemic mixture that is then separated

In 1907, another route with better yield was proposed. First, 2-(2'-hydroxypropyl)pyridine is reduced with phosphorus and fuming hydroiodic acid at 125 °C. Second, the product is treated with zinc dust and water. Finally, the product of the second step is treated with sodium in ethanol. Note: although the graphic below shows a single enantiomer of coniine, this reaction produces a racemic mixture that is then purified and separated.

A number of other syntheses of coniine have been effected, of which that of Diels and Alder is of special interest. The initial adduct of pyridine and dimethyl acetylenedicarboxylate is tetramethylquinolizine-1,2,3,4-tetracarboxylate, which on oxidation with dilute nitric acid is converted into trimethyl indolizine-tricarboxylate. This, on hydrolysis and decarboxylation, furnishes indolizine, the octahydro-derivate of which, also known as octahydropyrrocoline is converted by the cyanogen bromide method successively into the bromocyanamide, cyanamide and rac.-coniine. A synthesis of the alkaloid, starting from indolizine (pyrrocoline) is described by Ochiai and Tsuda.

The preparation of L-(R)-coniine by the reduction of β-coniceine (L-propenylpiperidine) by Löffler and Friedrich provides means for converting conhydrine to L-(R)-coniine. Hess and Eichel reported, incorrectly, that pelletierine was the aldehyde (β-2-piperidyl-propaldehyde) corresponding to coniine, and yielded rac-coniine when its hydrazone was heated with sodium ethoxide in ethanol at 156–170 °C. According to these authors, D-(S)-coniine is rendered almost optically inactive when heated with barium hydroxide and alcohol at 180–230 °C. Leithe has shown by observation of the optical rotation of (+)-pipecolic acid (piperidine-2-carboxylic acid) and some of its derivatives under varying conditions, that it must belong to the D-series of amino acids.

Currently, Coniine, and many other alkaloids, can be synthesized stereoselectively. For example, Pd-catalyzed 1,3-chirality transfer reaction can stereospecifically transform a single enantiomer of an allyl alcohol into a cyclic structure (in this case a piperidine). In this way, starting from (S)-alcohol an (S)-enantiomer of Coniine is obtained and vice versa. Remarkably, the separation of racemic alcohol into different enantiomers is done with the help of Candida antarctica lipase.

== Biosynthesis ==
The biosynthesis of coniine is still being investigated, but much of the pathway has been elucidated. Originally thought to use 4 acetyl groups as feed compounds for the polyketide synthase that forms coniine, it is in fact derived from two malonyl and a butyryl CoA, which are derived in the usual way from acetyl-CoA.

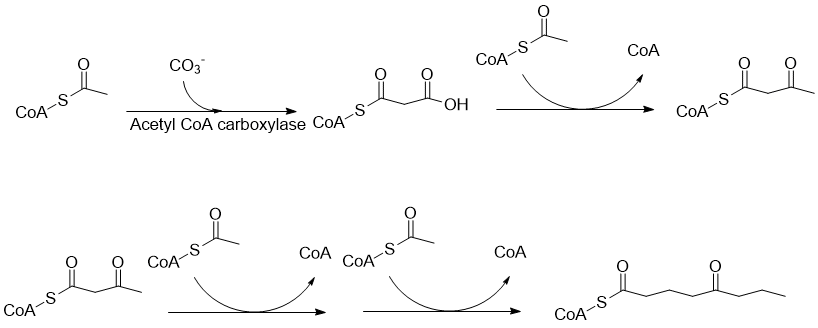

Further elongation of butyryl-CoA using 2 malonyl-CoA forms 5-ketooctanal. Ketooctanal then undergoes transamination using alanine:5-keto-octanal aminotransferase. The amine then spontaneously cyclizes and is dehydrated to form the coniine precursor γ–coniceine. This is then reduced using NADPH dependent y-coniceine reductase to form coniine.

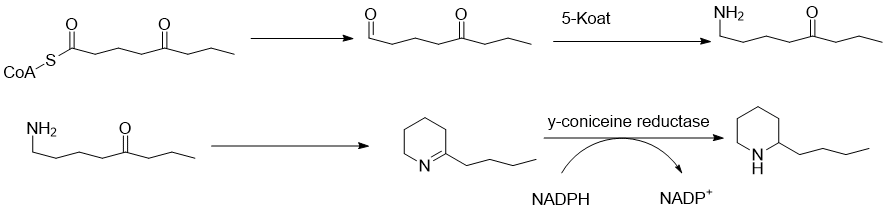

== In popular culture ==
Coniine is the murder weapon in Agatha Christie's mystery novel Five Little Pigs.

== See also ==
- Conium alkaloids
