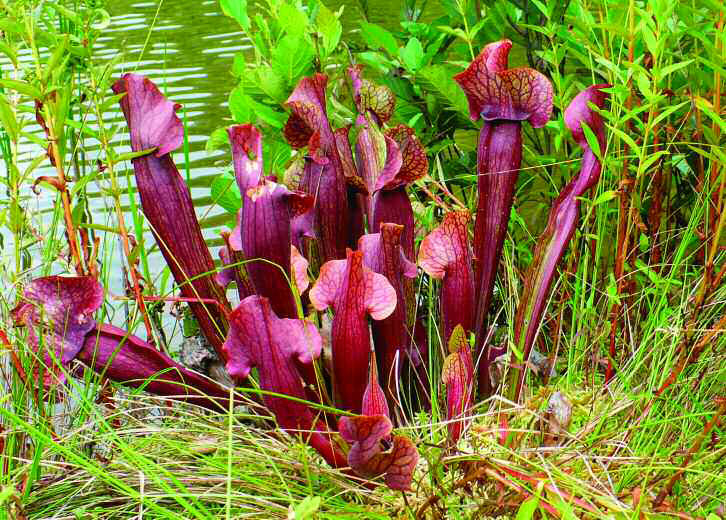

Scientific classification
- Kingdom: Plantae
- Clade: Embryophytes
- Clade: Tracheophytes
- Clade: Angiosperms
- Clade: Eudicots
- Clade: Asterids
- Order: Ericales
- Family: Sarraceniaceae
- Genus: Sarracenia
- Species: S. × charlesmoorei

Binomial name
- Sarracenia × charlesmoorei Mellich.

= Sarracenia × charlesmoorei =

Hybrid species of carnivorous plant

Sarracenia × charlesmoorei is a hybrid species of carnivorous plant native to southwest North Carolina, where it occurs in the southern Appalachian mountains. It is a hybrid between Sarracenia purpurea subsp. venosa var. montana and Sarracenia rubra subsp. jonesii, which have overlapping native ranges.

== Description ==
The appearance of Sarracenia × charlesmoorei may vary depending on how strong the hybrid is. A first generation plant has pitchers more erect than S. purpurea but wider and more robust than S. jonesii. The species often shows rich maroon veining and a deep red-purple throat, inheriting the intense pigments of both parents.

== Taxonomy ==
When the flowers of Sarracenia purpurea subsp. venosa var. montana and Sarracenia rubra subsp. jonesii are hybridized, their seed possesses hybrid qualities of both species. In 1821 the botanist Stephen Elliott described this plant as a distinct species in his Sketch of the Botany of South-Carolina and Georgia. He named it Sarracenia catesbaei, thinking it was a species in its own right rather than a hybrid. In 1904, Dr. Joseph Hinson Mellichamp, a physician and amateur botanist in South Carolina, realized that what Elliott called S. catesbaei was actually a natural hybrid. He proposed the name Sarracenia × charlesmoorei to honor his friend and fellow collector, "Charles F. Moore, a well-known naturalist from Brevard, North Carolina".
