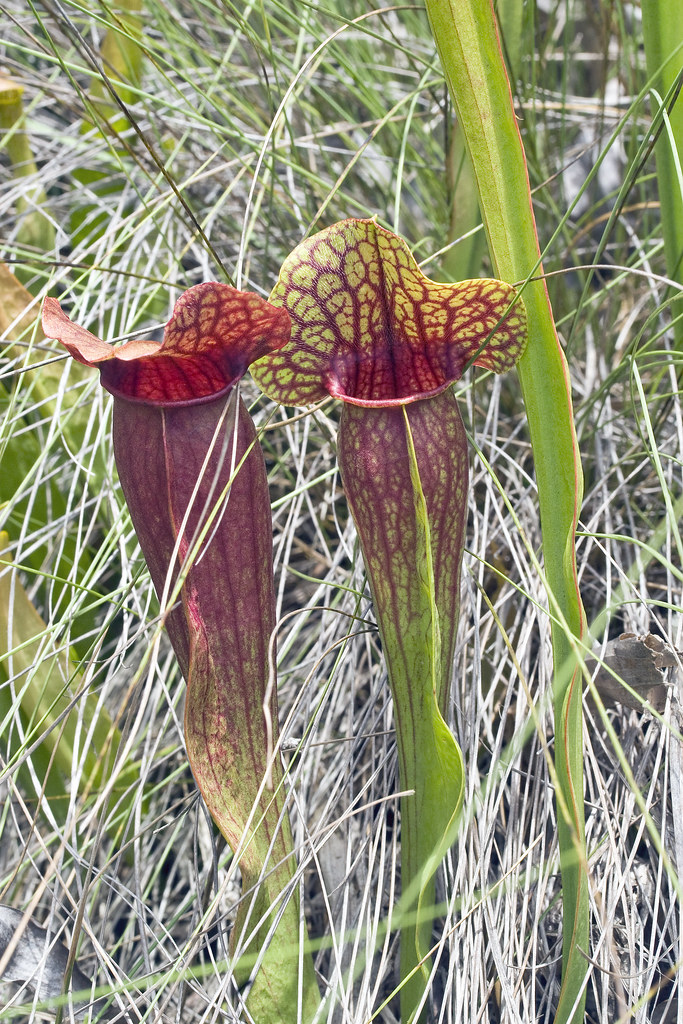

Scientific classification
- Kingdom: Plantae
- Clade: Tracheophytes
- Clade: Angiosperms
- Clade: Eudicots
- Clade: Asterids
- Order: Ericales
- Family: Sarraceniaceae
- Genus: Sarracenia
- Species: S. × naczii

Binomial name
- Sarracenia × naczii Mellich.

Synonyms
- Sarracenia naczii

= Sarracenia × naczii =

Species of carnivorous plant

Sarracenia × naczii is a hybrid of Sarracenia flava and Sarracenia rosea, carnivorous plants in the family Sarraceniaceae, described by T. Lawrence Mellichamp.
