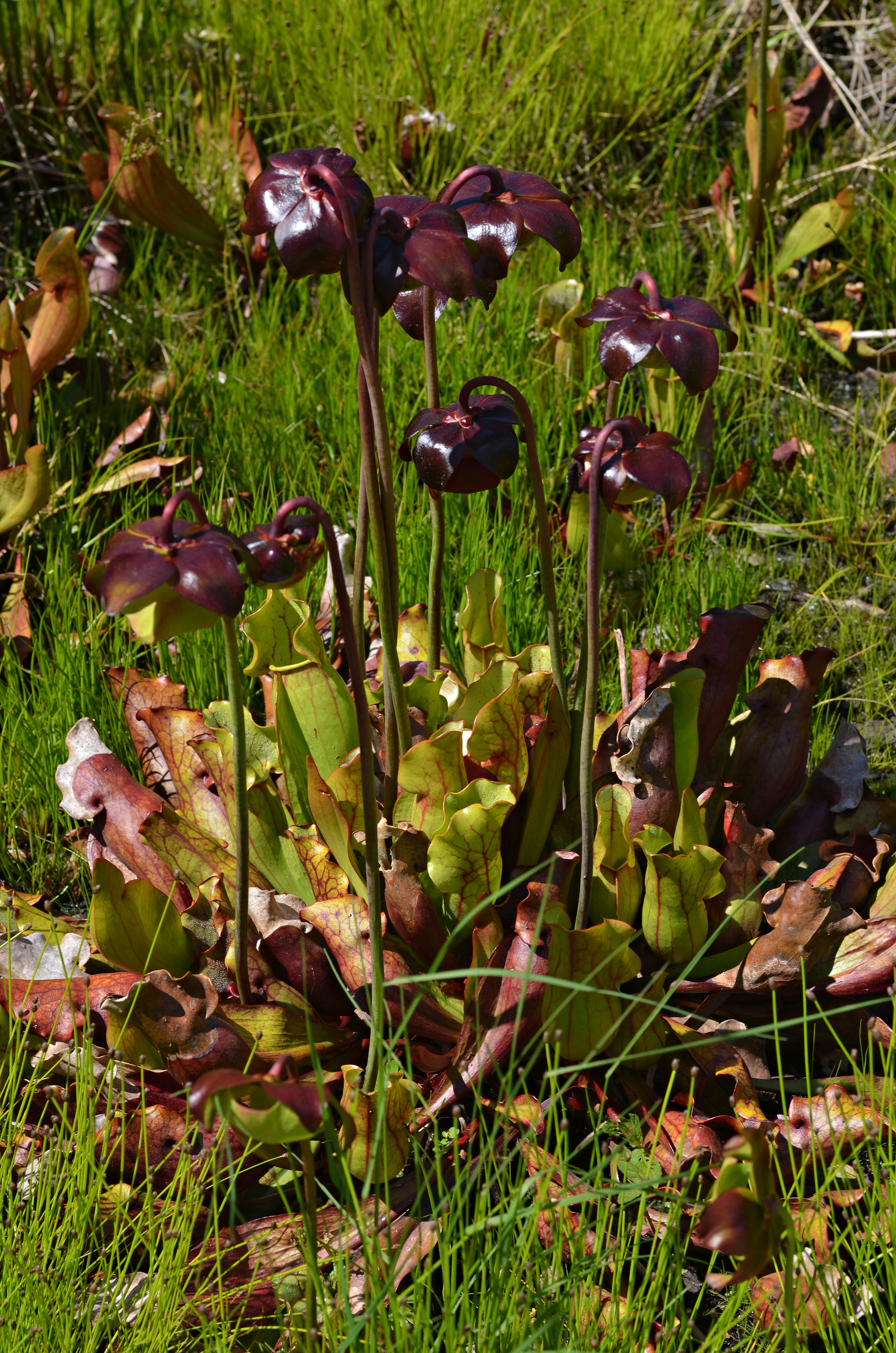

Conservation status
- Secure (NatureServe)
- CITES Appendix II

Scientific classification
- Kingdom: Plantae
- Clade: Tracheophytes
- Clade: Angiosperms
- Clade: Eudicots
- Clade: Asterids
- Order: Ericales
- Family: Sarraceniaceae
- Genus: Sarracenia
- Species: S. purpurea

Binomial name
- Sarracenia purpurea L.
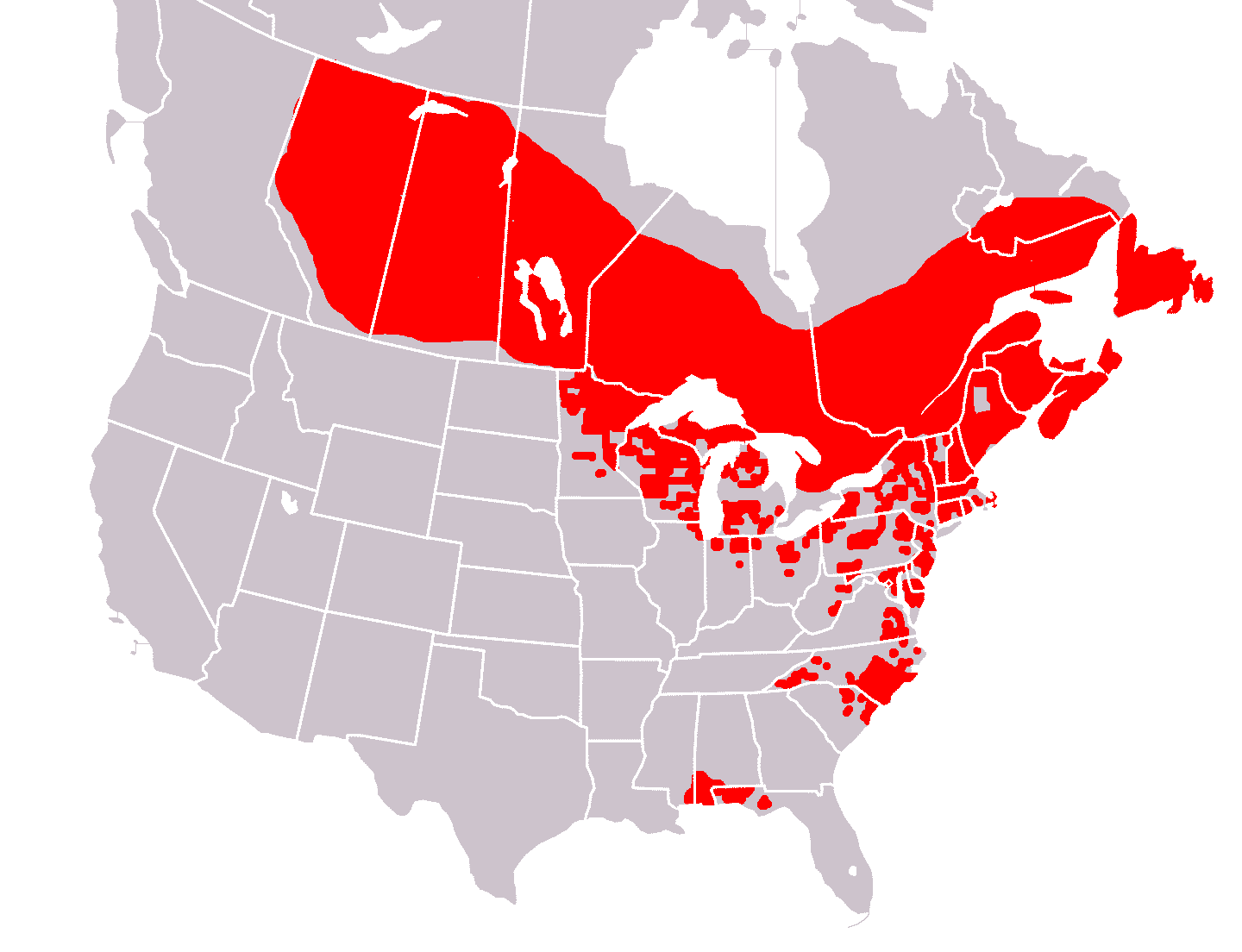
- Sarracenia purpurea range in the USA and Canada

= Sarracenia purpurea =

Species of carnivorous plant

Sarracenia purpurea, the purple pitcher plant, northern pitcher plant, turtle socks, or side-saddle flower, is a carnivorous plant in the family Sarraceniaceae.

== Taxonomy ==
The species is further divided into two subspecies, S. purpurea subsp. purpurea and S. purpurea subsp. venosa. The former is found north of New Jersey north, while the latter is found south of New Jersey and tolerates warmer temperatures.

Subspecies

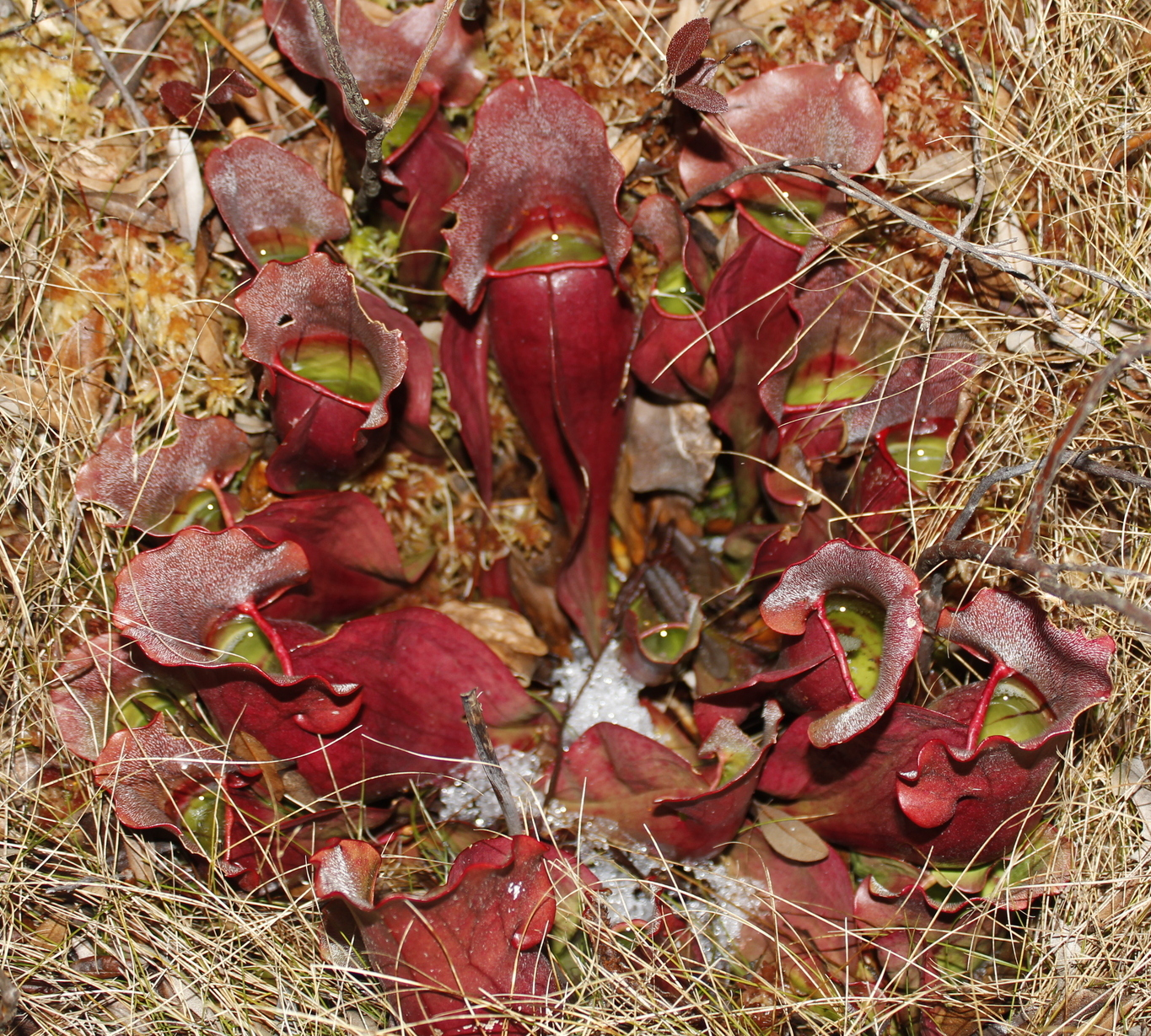
S. p. purpurea, in Massachusetts

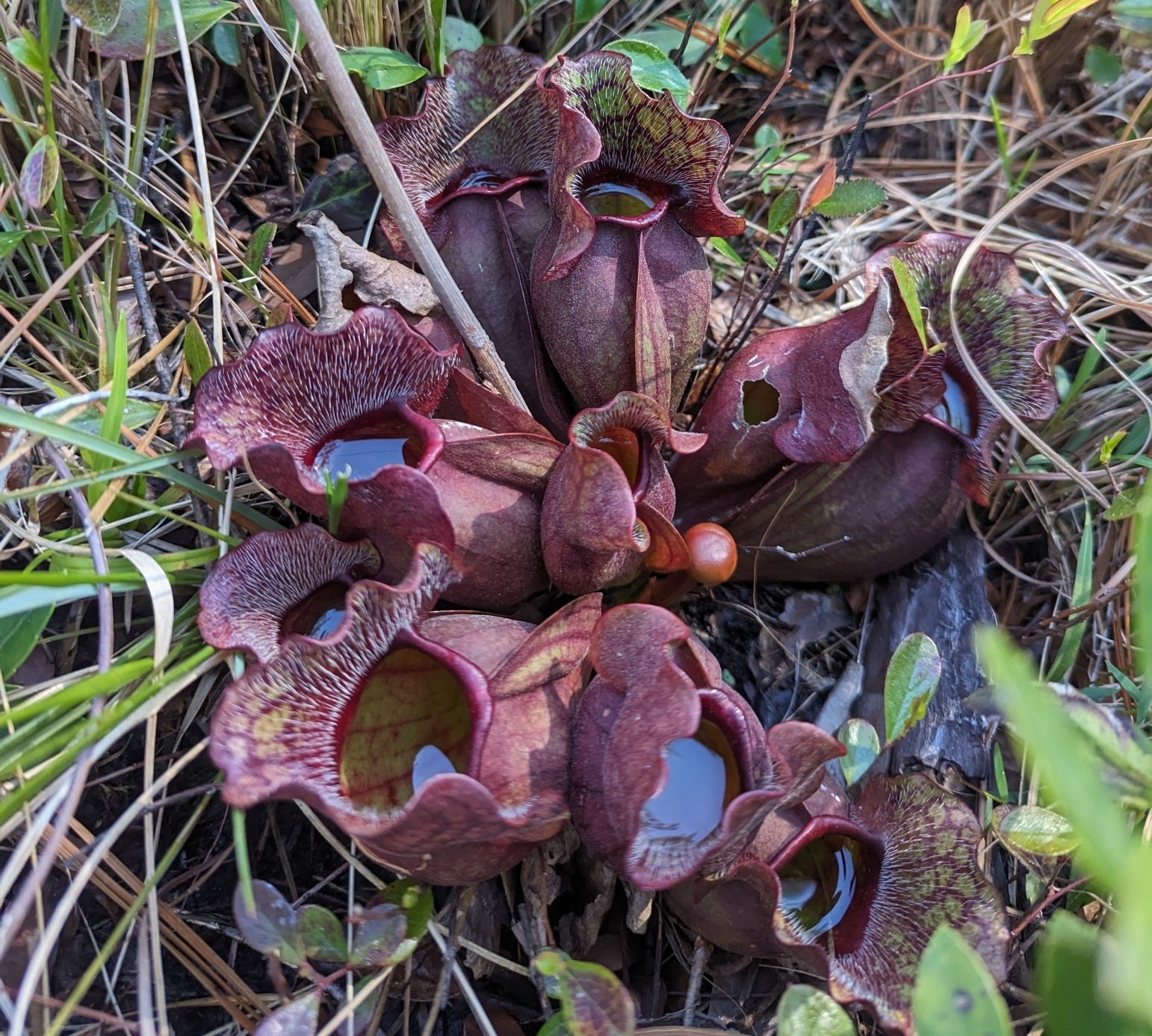
S. p. venosa, in North Carolina

Leaf

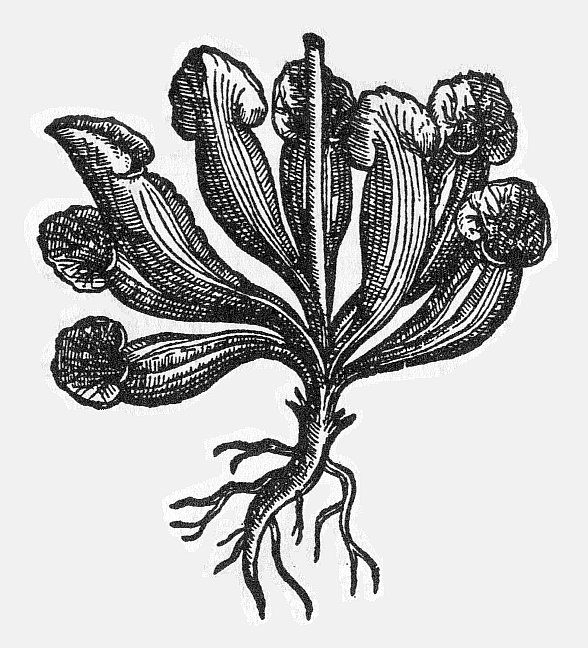
Oldest known illustration of Sarracenia purpurea, from Clusius's Rariorum plantarum historia, cf. 18, 1601

In 1999, Sarracenia purpurea subsp. venosa var. burkii was described as a species of its own: Sarracenia rosea. This re-ranking has been debated among carnivorous plant enthusiasts since then, but further morphological evidence has supported the split. The following species and infraspecific taxa are usually recognized:

- Sarracenia purpurea subsp. purpurea
  - Sarracenia purpurea subsp. purpurea f. heterophylla
  - Sarracenia purpurea subsp. purpurea f. ruplicola (invalid)
- Sarracenia purpurea subsp. venosa
  - Sarracenia purpurea subsp. venosa var. burkii [=S. rosea]
    - Sarracenia purpurea subsp. venosa var. burkii f. luteola
  - Sarracenia purpurea subsp. venosa var. montana

== Carnivory ==
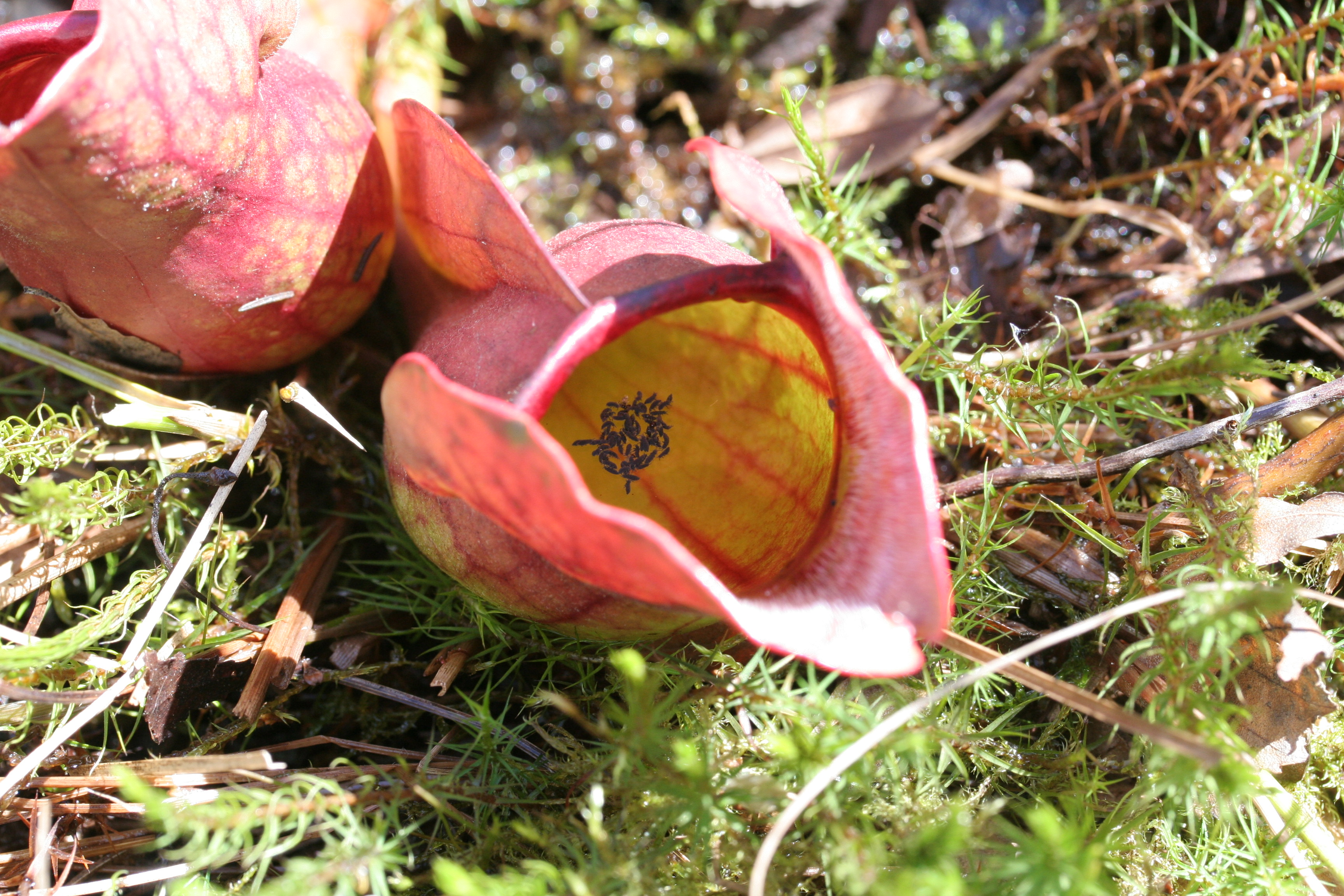
S. purpurea with springtails, St-Narcisse, Quebec, Canada

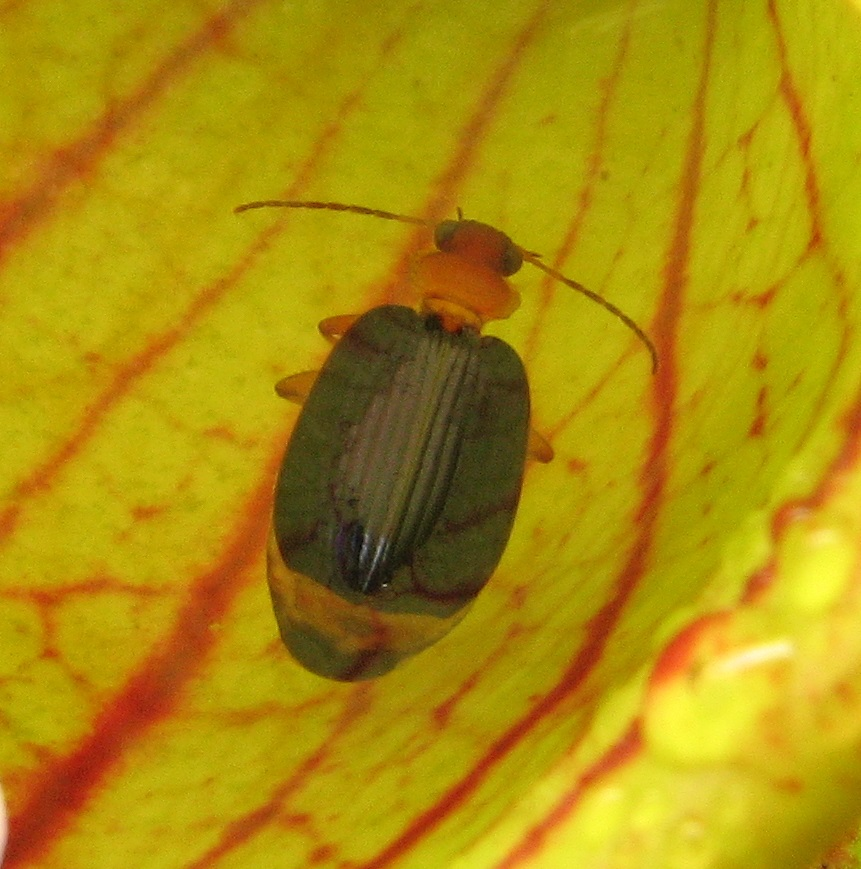
Lebia grandis ground beetle trapped inside pitcher

Like other species of Sarracenia, S. purpurea obtains most of its nutrients through prey capture. However, prey acquisition is said to be inefficient, with less than 1% of the visiting prey captured within the pitcher. Even so, anecdotal evidence by growers often shows that pitchers quickly fill up with prey during the warm summer months. Prey fall into the pitcher and drown in the rainwater that collects in the base of each leaf.

Prey items, such as flies, ants, spiders, and even moths or hornets, are then digested by an invertebrate community, made up mostly by the mosquito Wyeomyia smithii and the midge Metriocnemus knabi. The relationship between W. smithii and S. purpurea is an example of commensalism.

Protists, rotifers (including Habrotrocha rosa), and bacteria form the base of inquiline food web that shreds and mineralizes available prey, making nutrients available to the plant. New pitcher leaves do produce digestive enzymes such as hydrolases and proteases, but as the individual leaves get older into their second year, digestion of prey material is aided by the community of bacteria that live within the pitchers.

=== Vertebrate prey ===
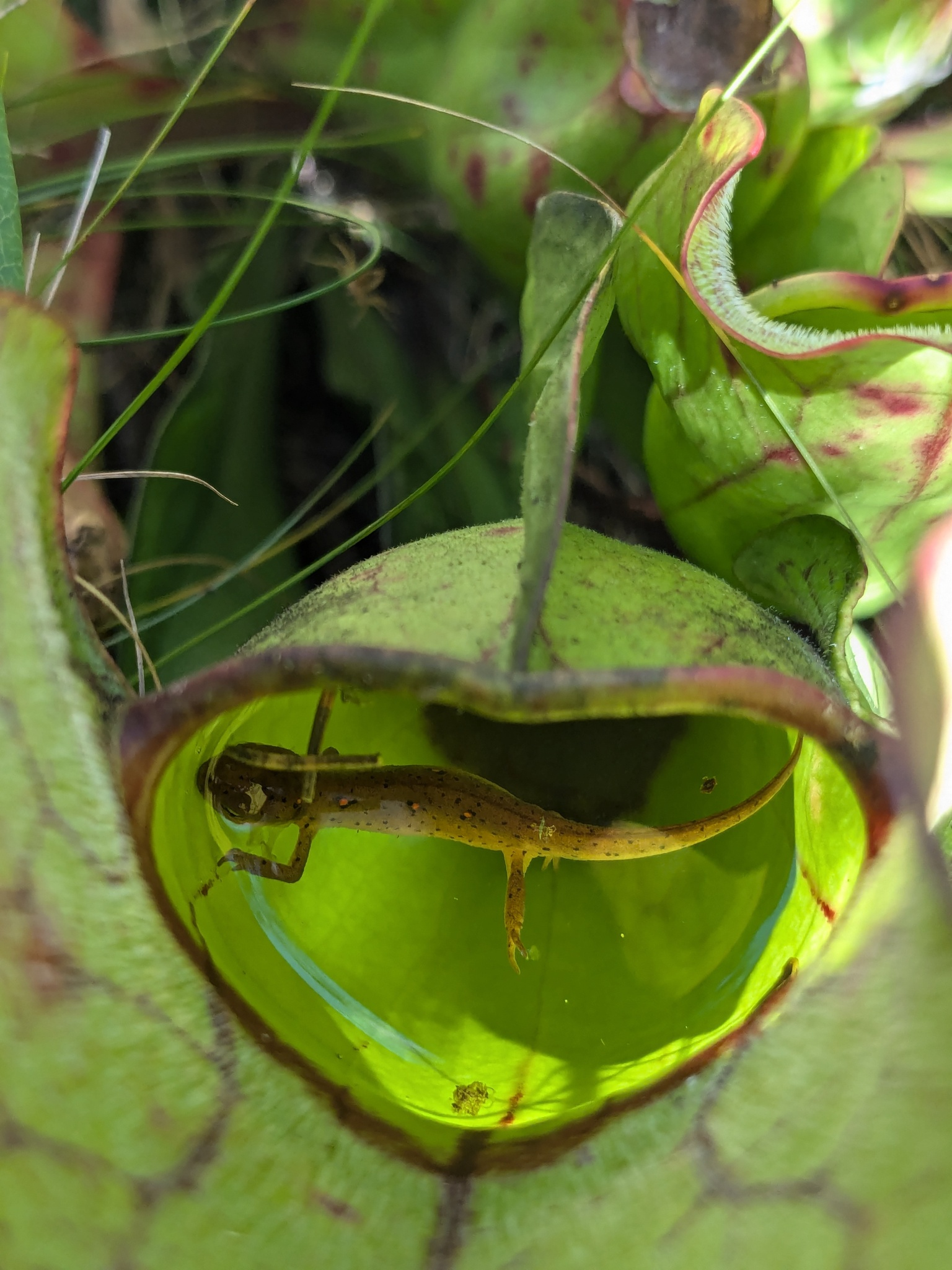
S. p. purpurea with a trapped eastern newt, in Vermont.

S. purpurea traps juvenile eastern newts with enough regularity that nearly 20% of plants in an Ontario population were found to contain one or more salamanders in a 2019 study. The salamanders were observed to die within three to nineteen days, and may be killed as the small pools of water in the plant are heated by the sun. A single salamander could provide hundreds to thousands of times the nutrients of invertebrate prey, but it is not known how efficiently S. purpurea is able to digest them. This behaviour has also been recorded occurring in Massachusetts.

== Distribution ==
Species of Sarracenia grow in nutrient-poor, acid bogs. S. purpurea's range includes the Eastern seaboard, the Great Lakes region, all of Canada (except Nunavut and Yukon), Washington state, and Alaska. That makes it the most common and broadly distributed pitcher plant, as well as the only member of the genus that inhabits cold temperate climates. How the species traveled so far is still a mystery. From what is known so far the Sarracenia has a median seed dispersal distance of 5 cm (2 inches), which is not far enough to explain the plant's widespread occurrence throughout North America. It is endangered or vulnerable over much of the southern part of its range. Most varieties along the Gulf Coast of the United States that were once identified as Sarracenia purpurea have since been reclassified as Sarracenia rosea.

It is an introduced and naturalized species in Europe and the northwestern US. It is found in habitats of the native carnivorous species Darlingtonia californica, in the Klamath Mountains and northern Sierra Nevada. The plant has also been recorded in Washington state, Austria, the Czech Republic, Denmark, France, Germany, Ireland, Sweden, Switzerland, and the United Kingdom. In Britain and Ireland purple pitcher plant have been introduced into some heather-rich peatbogs and with the mild climate have integrated into the local flora of some specific areas. But observations made by researchers throughout almost a century have seen no signs of the plant spreading to other bogs, because of the highly fragmented distribution of bogs in Britain and Ireland.

== Uses ==
=== Symbolic ===
The species is the floral emblem of the Canadian province of Newfoundland and Labrador since 1954. Queen Victoria was the first to select the plant as a provincial symbol to be portrayed on the province's penny until 1938.

=== Ornamental ===
Sarracenia purpurea is cultivated as an ornamental plant. It is fairly hardy, but requires a reliably damp soil in a sheltered position, with full or partial sunlight. The subspecies S. purpurea ssp. purpurea has received the Royal Horticultural Society's Award of Garden Merit.

=== Medicinal ===
It was used as a medicinal plant by Native American and First Nation tribes in its northeastern and Great Lakes distribution ranges, including the Algonquin, Cree, Haudenosaunee, and Mi'kmaq peoples, primarily for use in treating smallpox by means of a root infusion. A 2012 study suggests Sarracenia purpurea is effective as a treatment for viruses in the Orthopoxvirus family, including the smallpox virus, through inhibition of early virus transcription.

=== Biocontrol ===
Sarracenia purpurea pitchers have been investigated as a biocontrol for the Asian Hornet Vespa velutina in Europe, as they act as natural bottle traps in which hornets have been observed to be trapped. The hybrids used in the study, S. x "Juthatip Soper" and S. x "Evendine", were deemed too unselective, but the researchers proposed that trying other pitcher plant species may be more effective.

== Gallery ==
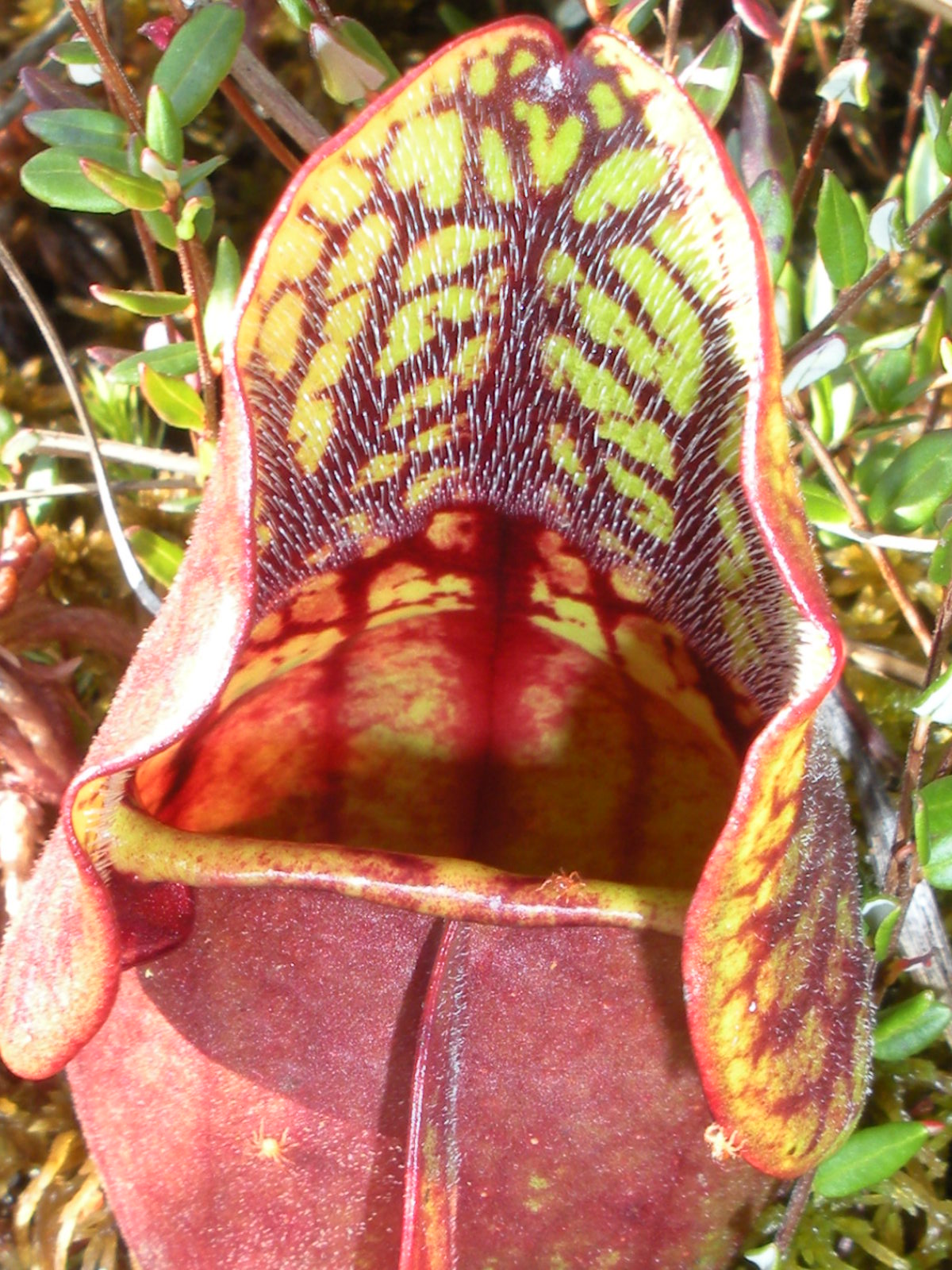
In Minnesota

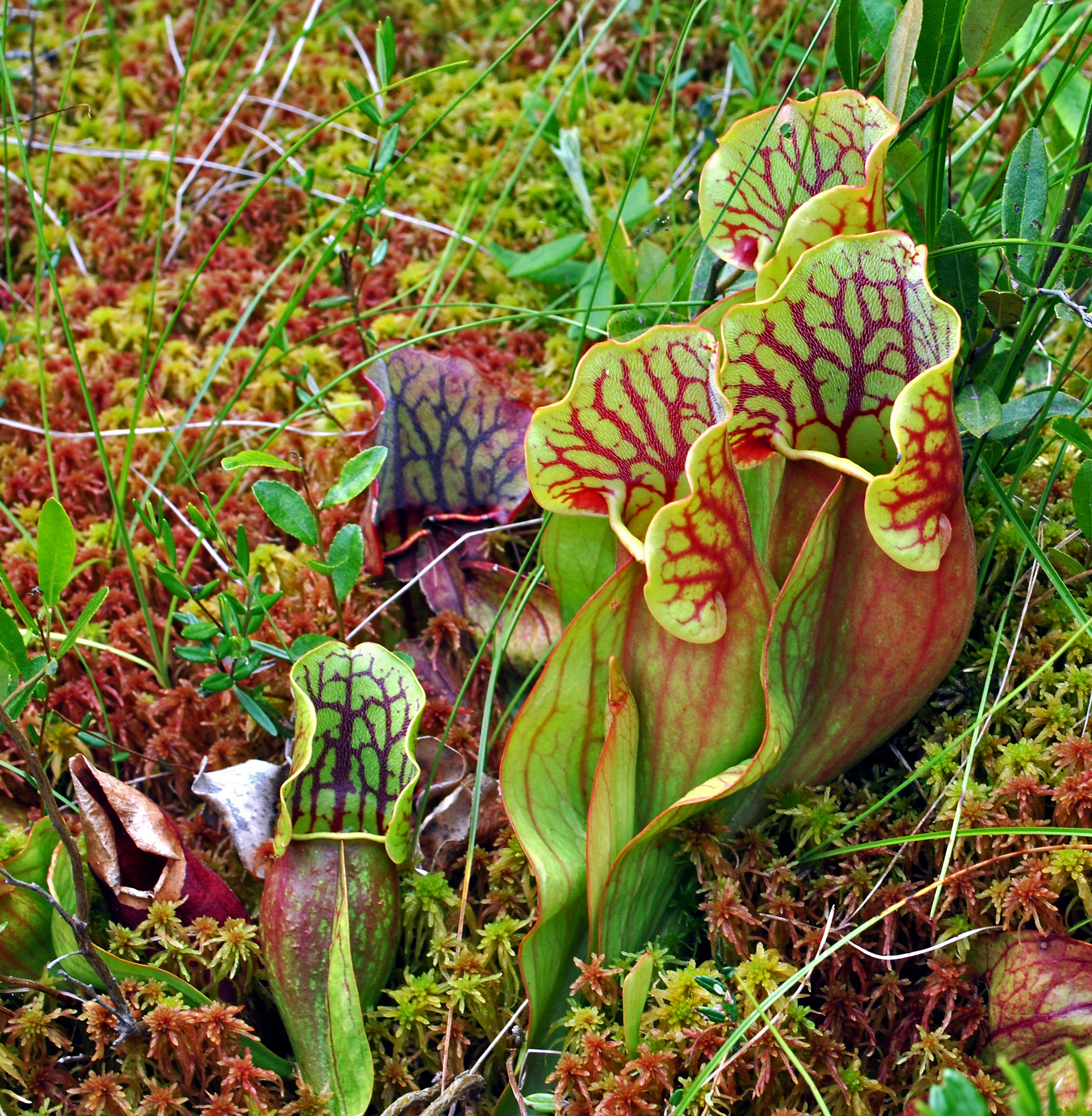
In Wisconsin

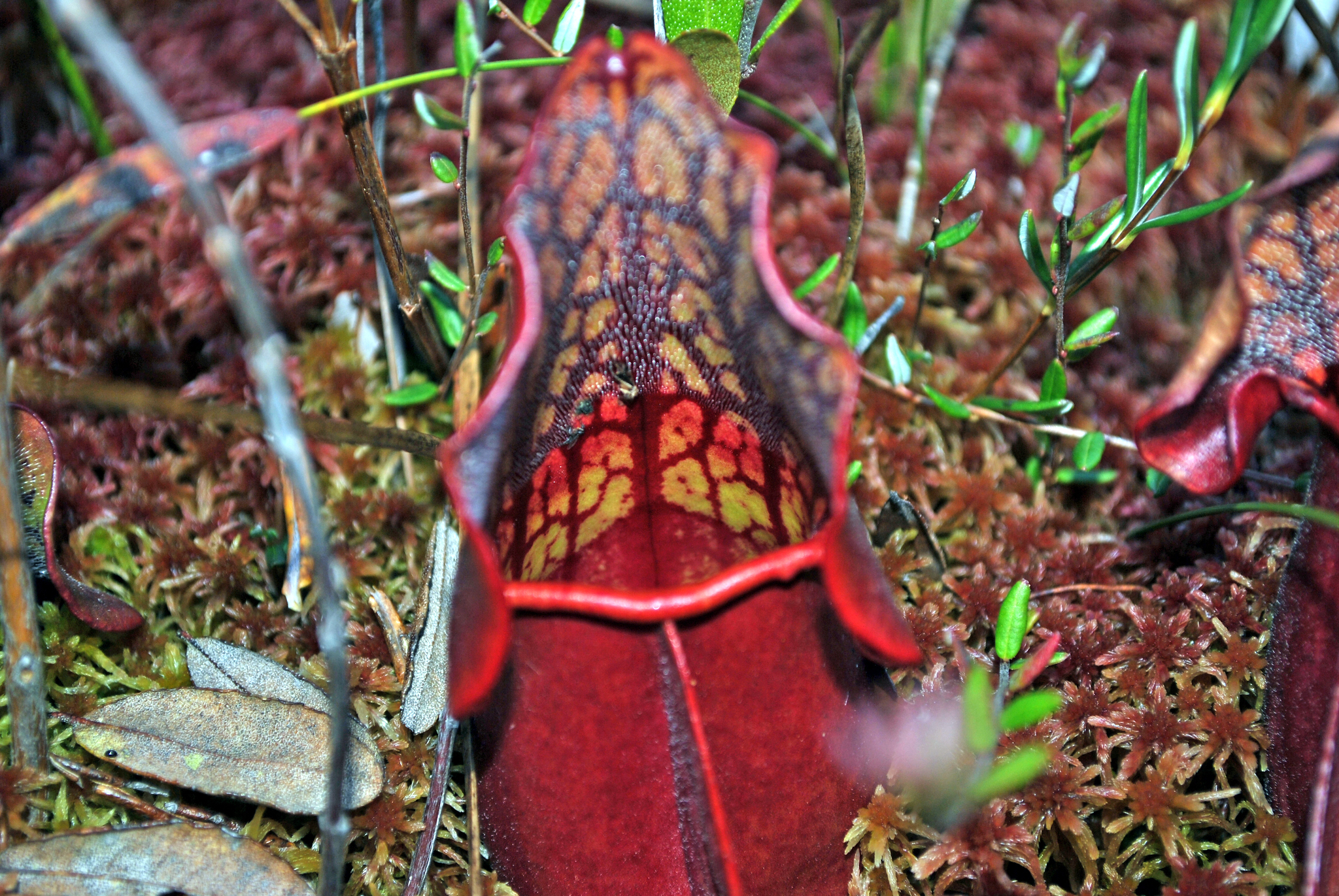
In Wisconsin

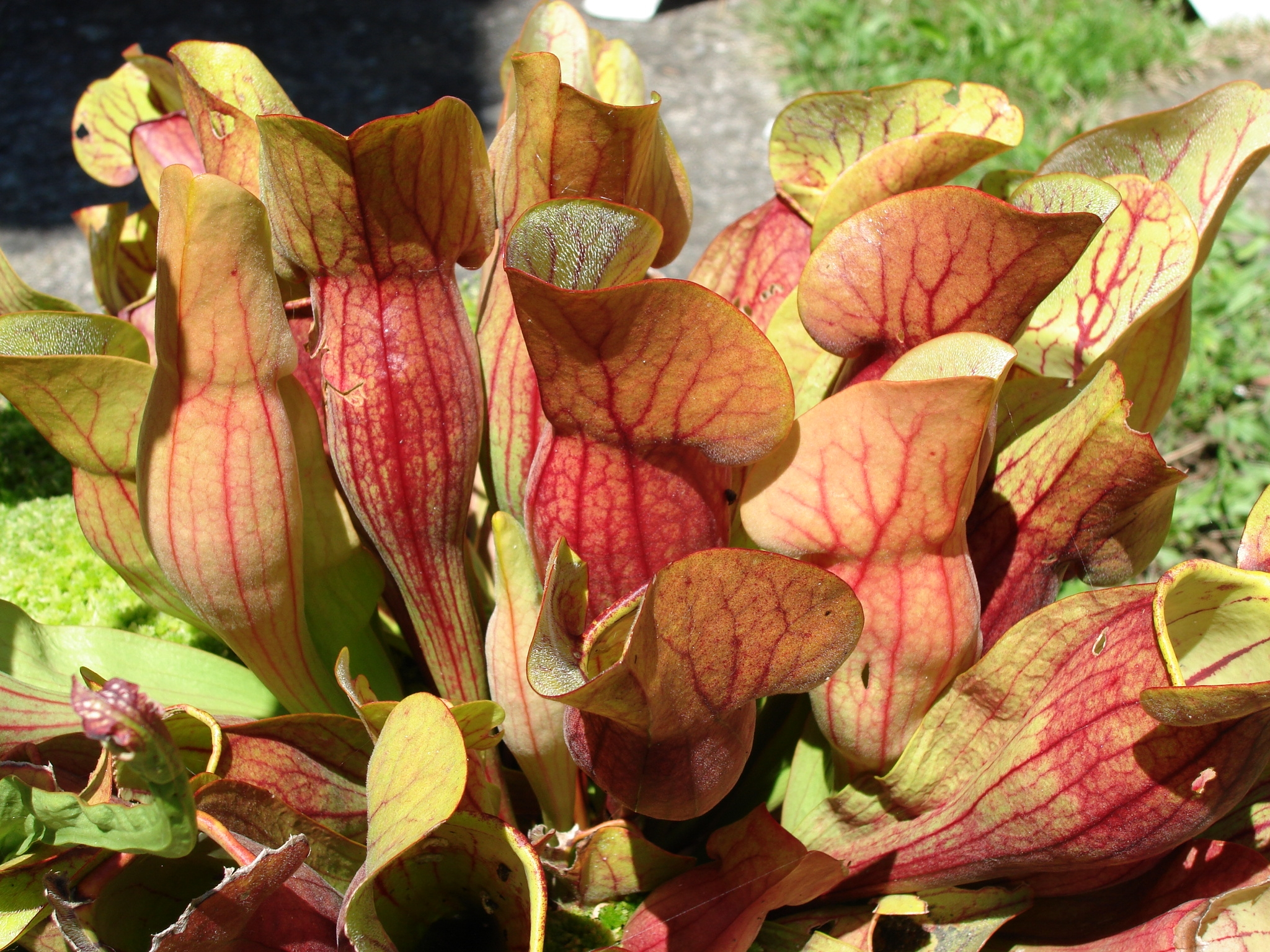
Cultivated S. purpurea, in France

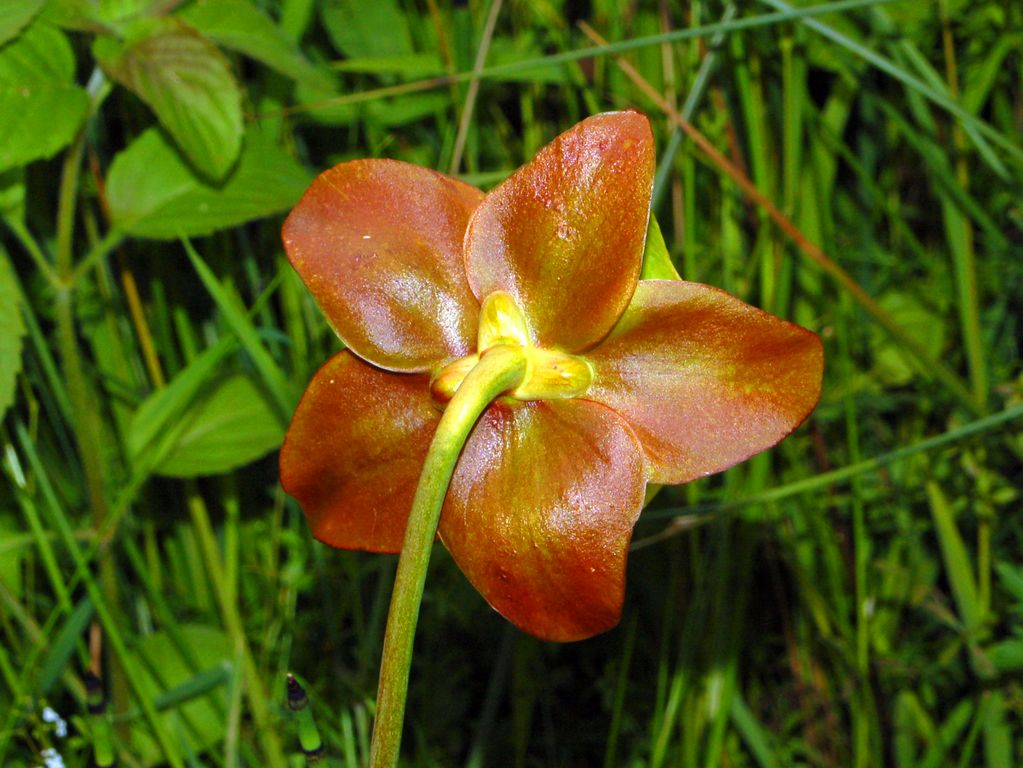
Flower (back)

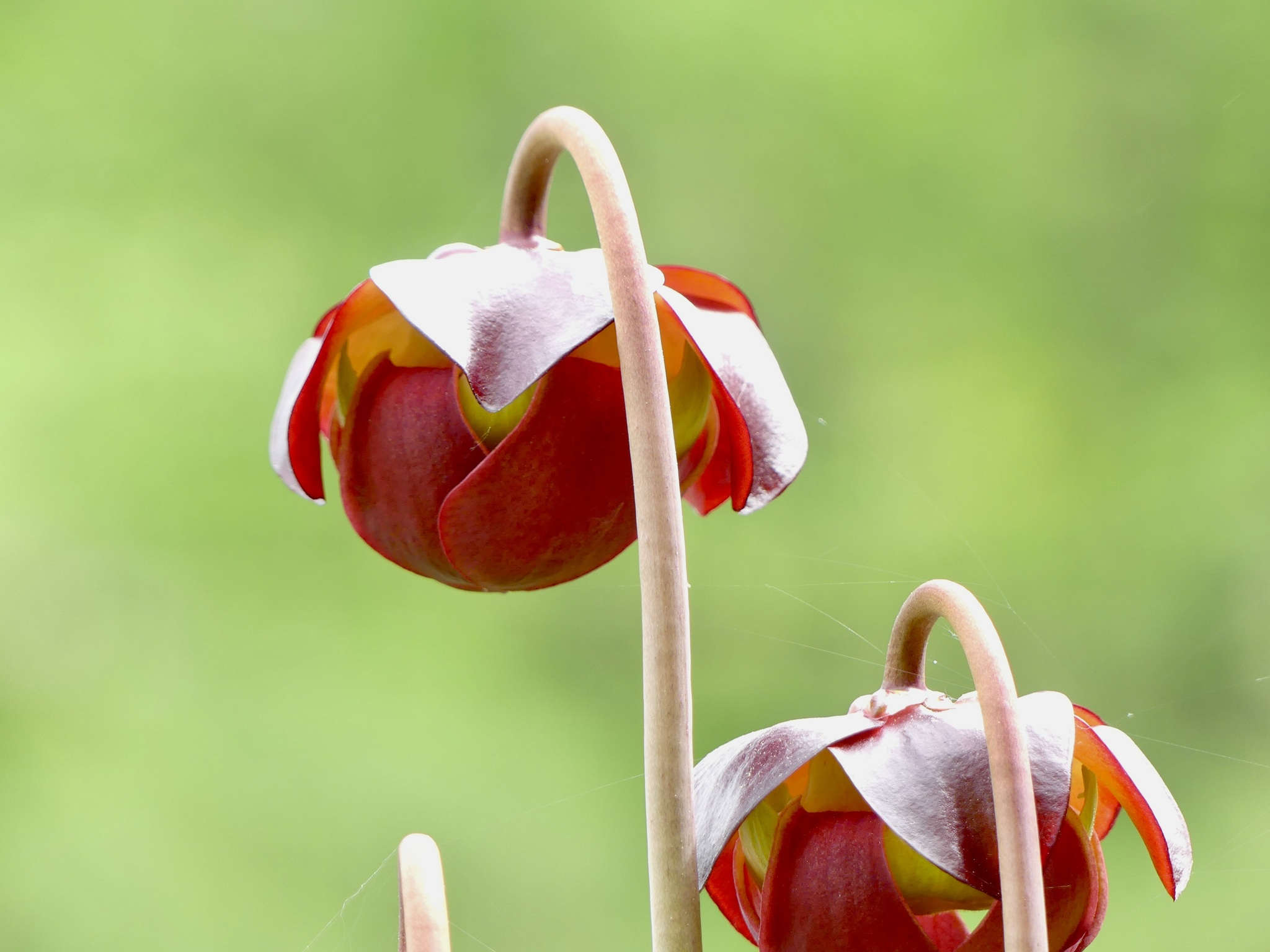
Flower (side), in Ontario

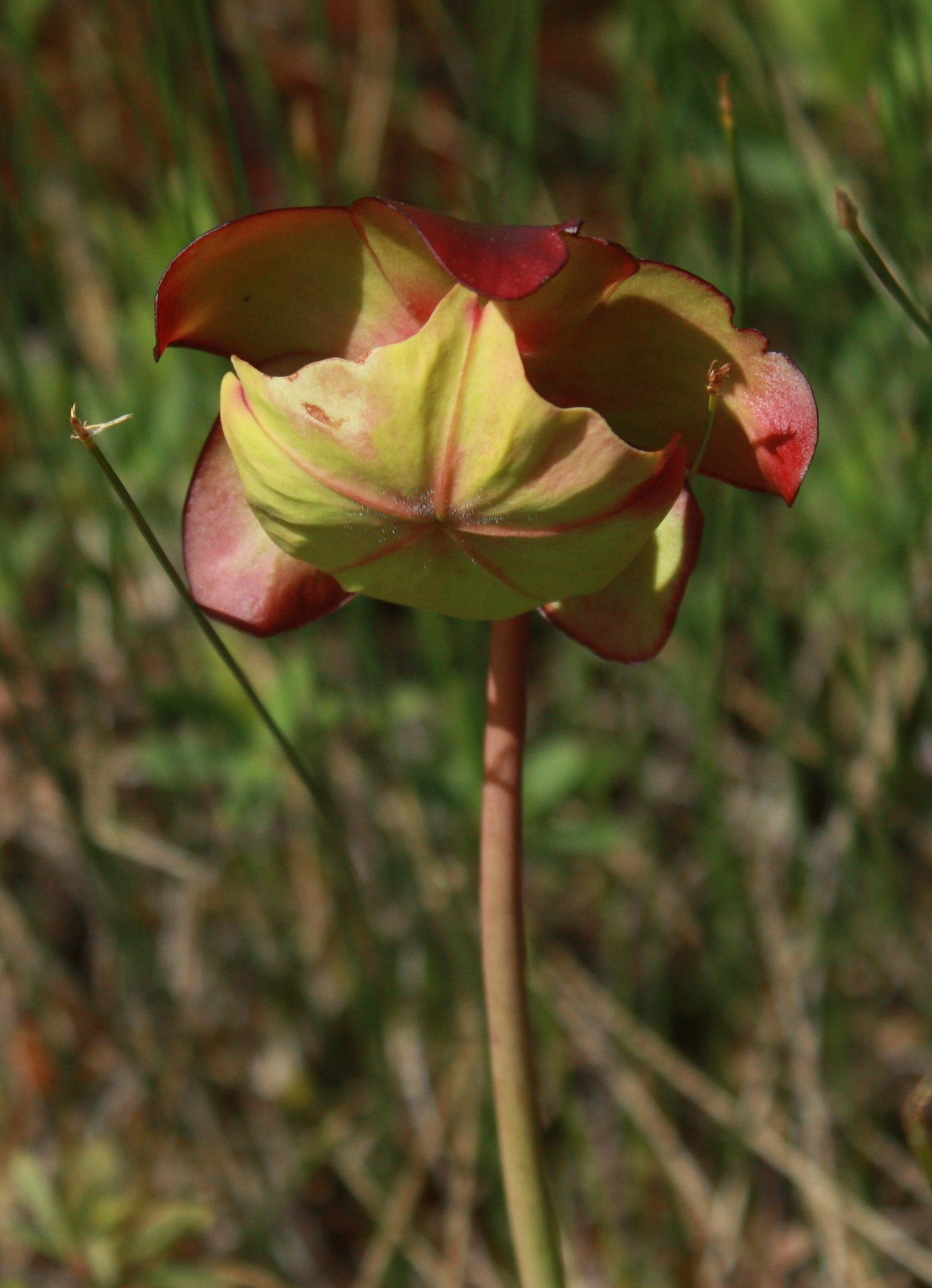
Flower (front), in Quebec

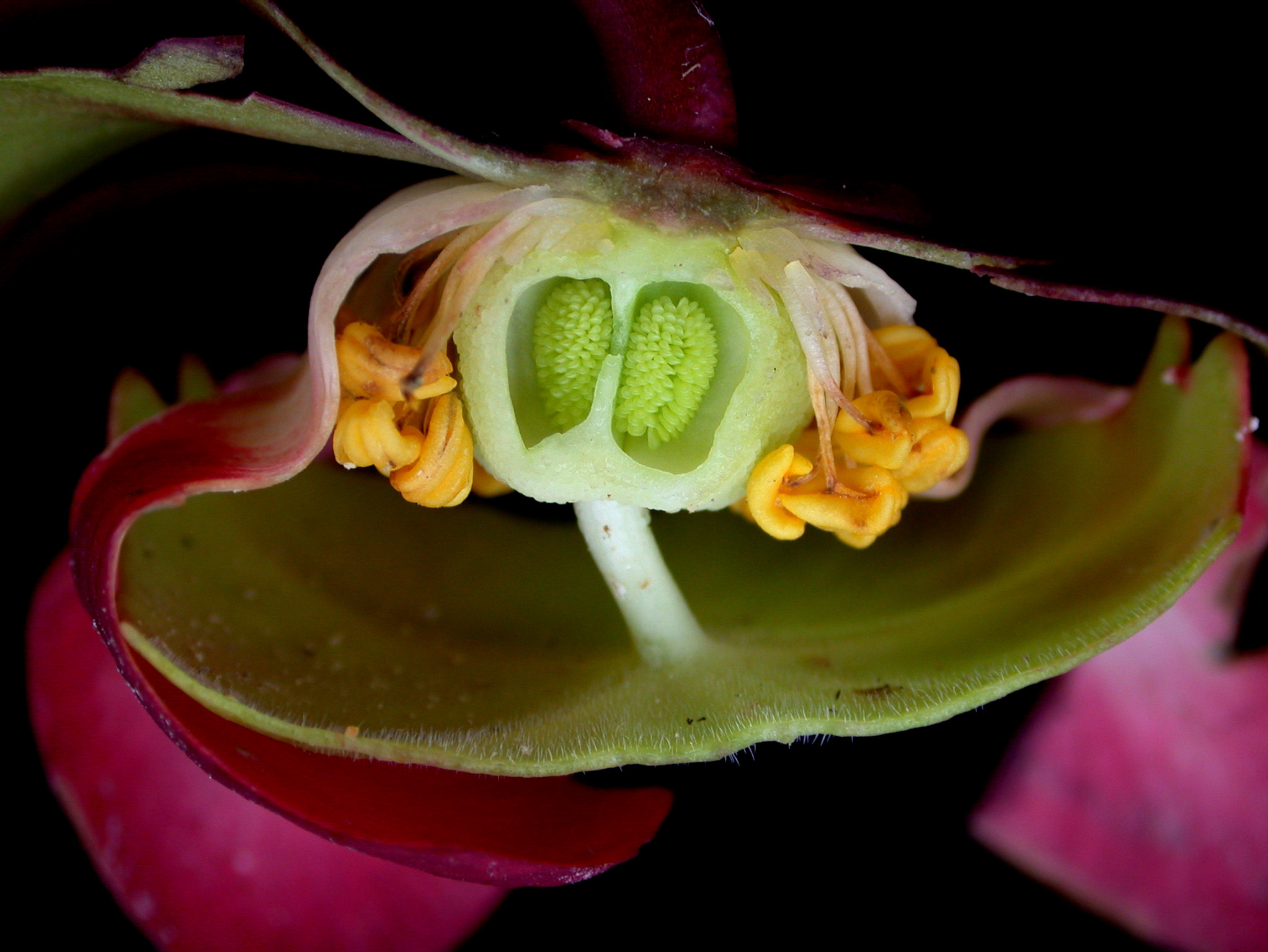
Flower cross section

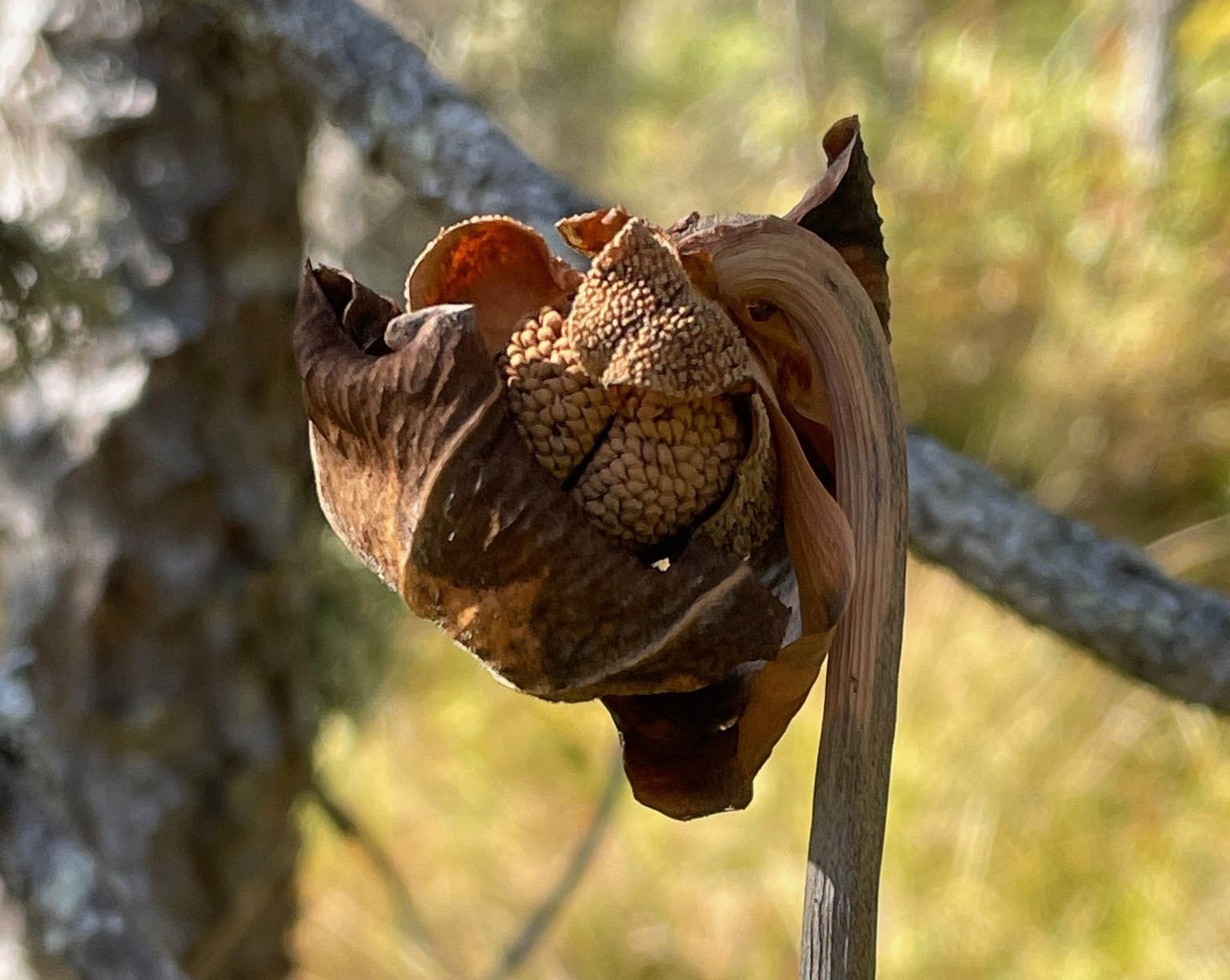
Seed pod

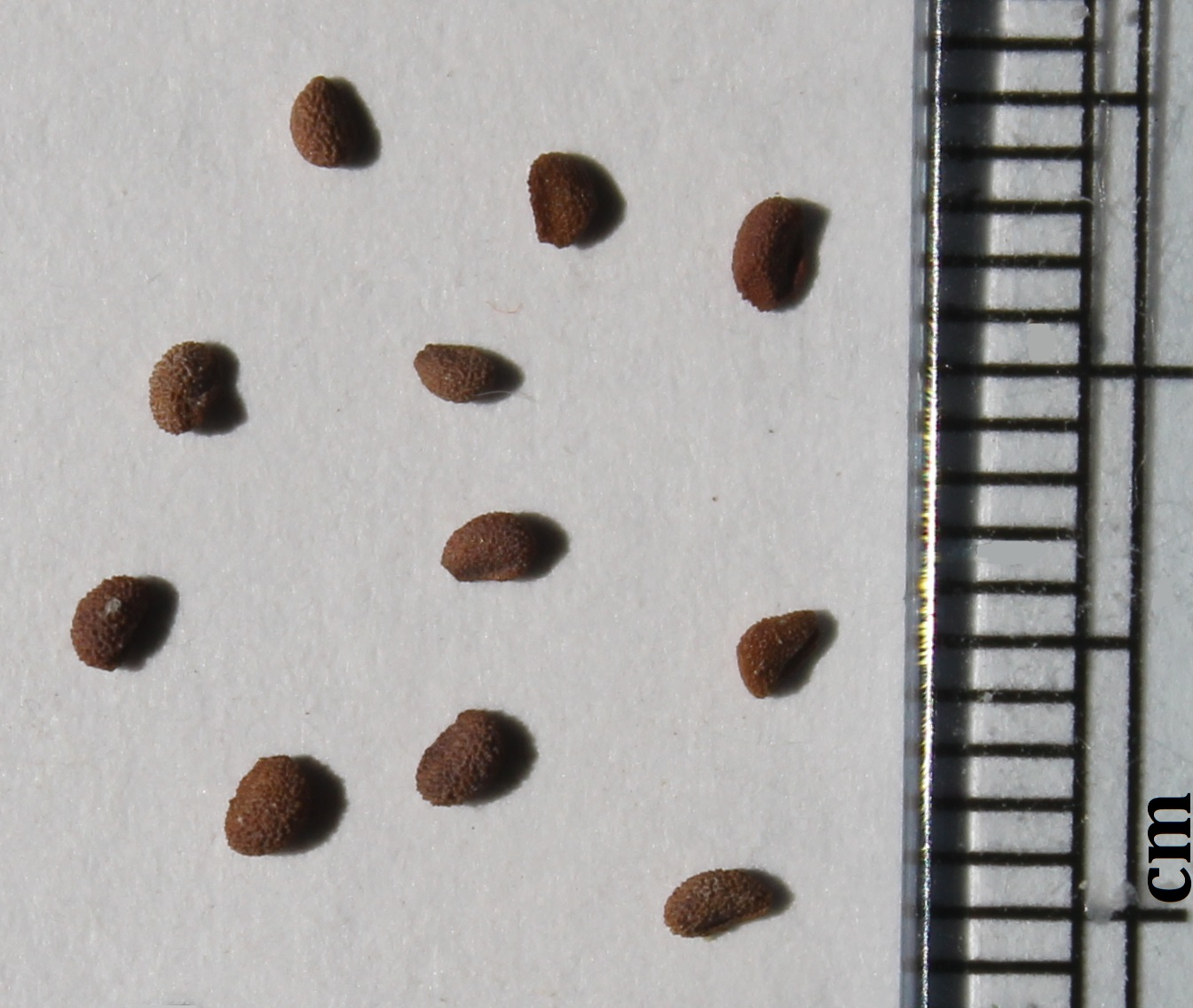
Seeds

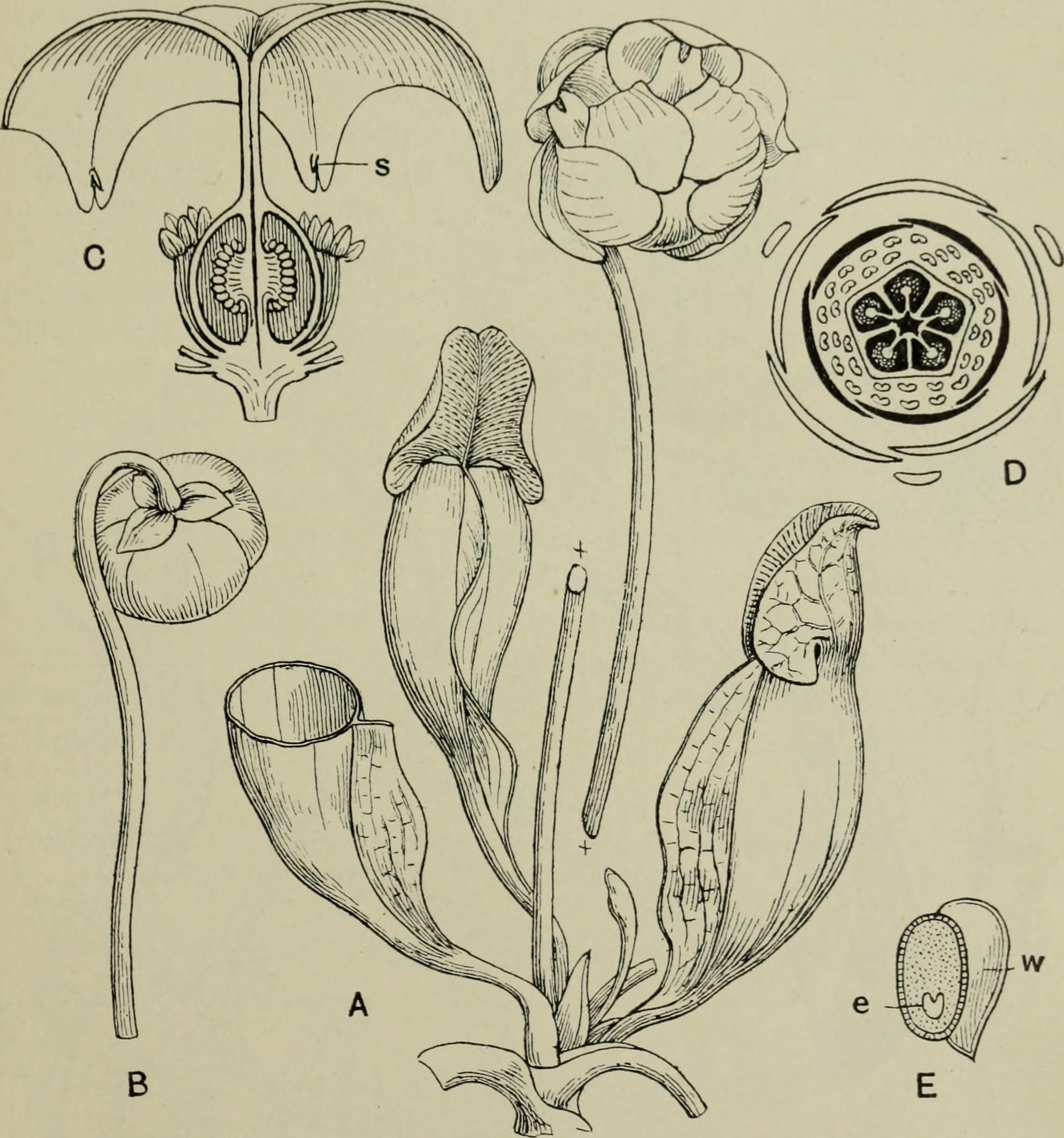
1904 anatomical illustration

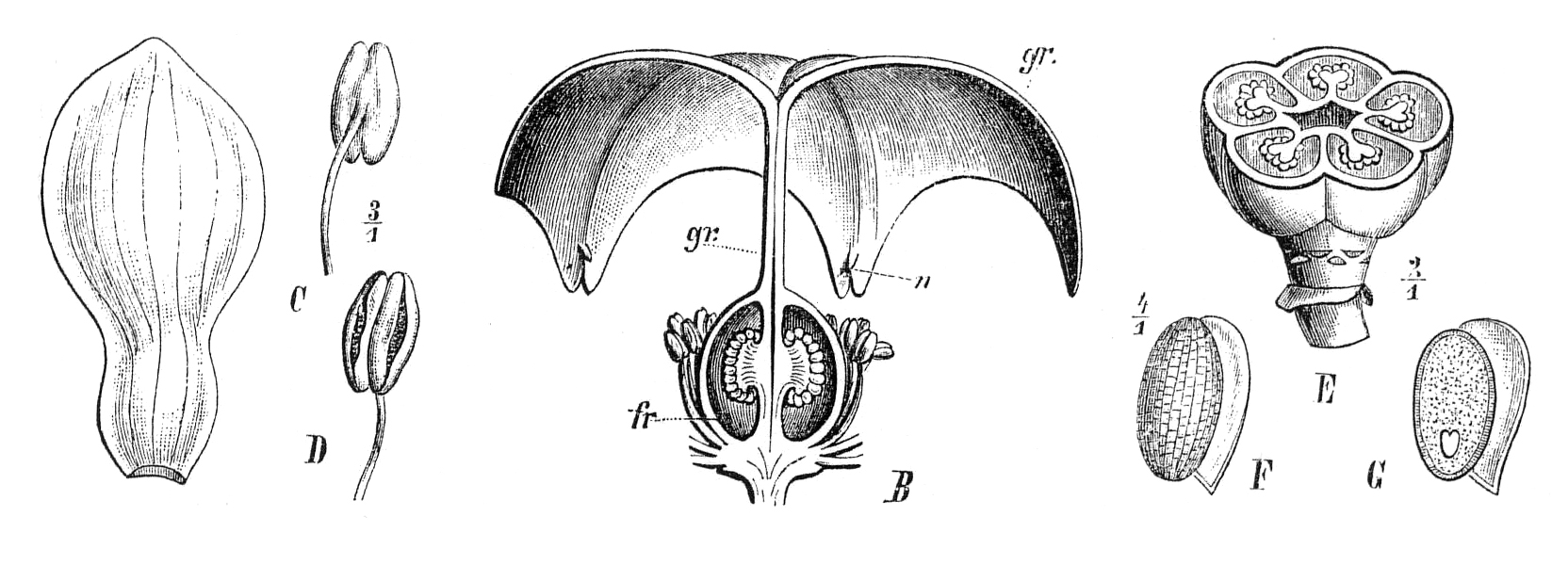
1908 anatomical illustration
