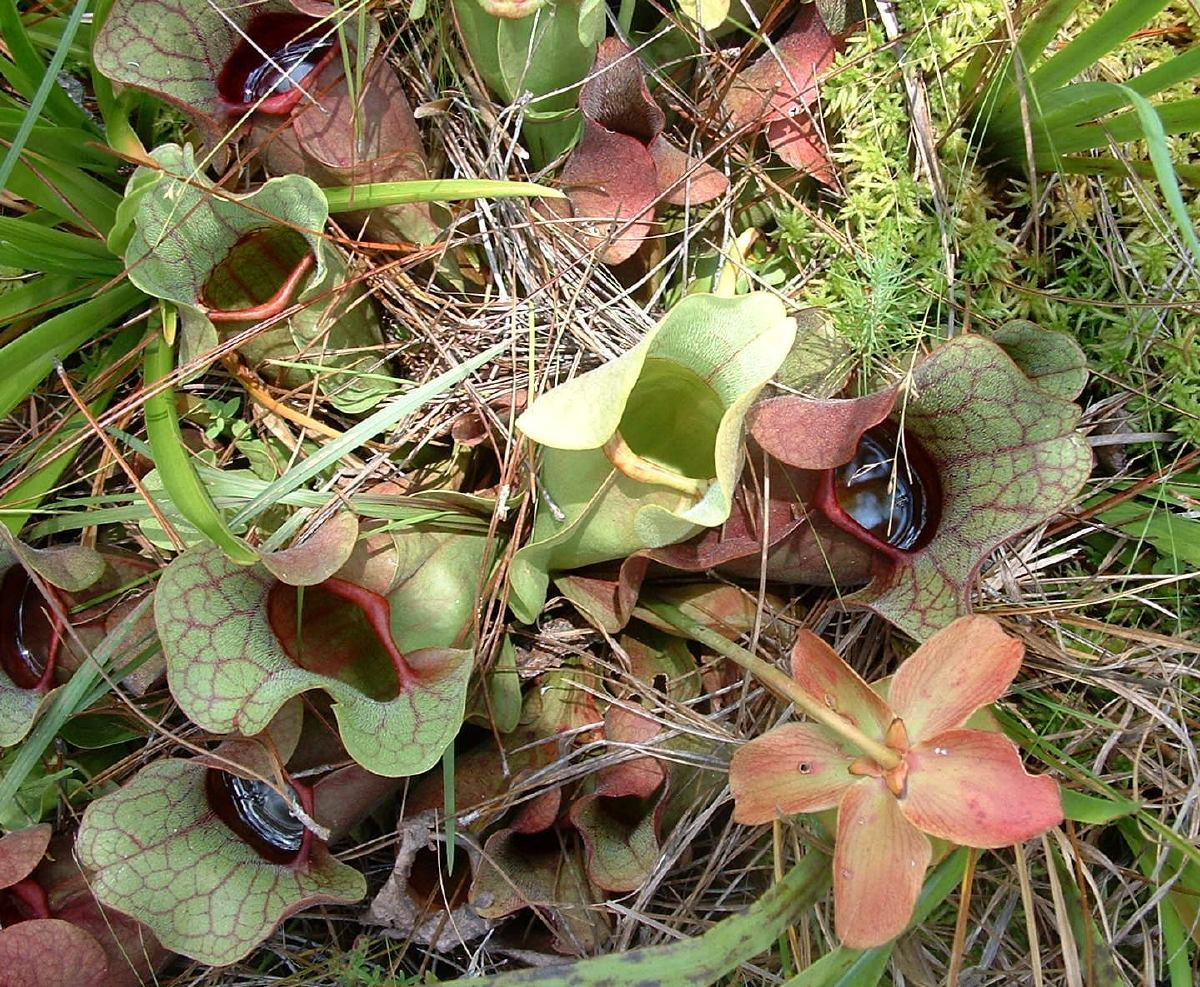
- Sarracenia rosea from Florida

Conservation status
- Vulnerable (NatureServe)

Scientific classification
- Kingdom: Plantae
- Clade: Tracheophytes
- Clade: Angiosperms
- Clade: Eudicots
- Clade: Asterids
- Order: Ericales
- Family: Sarraceniaceae
- Genus: Sarracenia
- Species: S. rosea

Binomial name
- Sarracenia rosea Naczi, Case & R.B.Case

Forms
- S. rosea f. luteola (Hanrahan & James M.Mill.) Naczi, Case & R.B.Case

Synonyms
- S. purpurea subsp. venosa var. burkii

= Sarracenia rosea =

Species of carnivorous plant

Sarracenia rosea is a species of pitcher plant in the genus Sarracenia and is sometimes known as Burk's southern pitcher plant.

== Taxonomy ==
It was previously classified as a variety of S. purpurea subsp. venosa (var. burkii). The proposition for the plant to be named a new species arose in 1999. This proposition was based on three main factors: S. rosea has larger flowers on shorter stalks; it produces light pink petals, a feature no other species in the genus exhibits; and it has a somewhat different pitcher structure than S. purpurea. A form which lacks anthocyanins has been described as Sarracenia rosea f. luteola.

== Distribution and habitat ==
The species is native to the Gulf Coast of the Southeastern United States, and has been found from Mississippi to Georgia. However, the areas in which the plant occurs are being developed, so the species's habitat is threatened. Along with Sarracenia psittacina, however, this species readily colonizes drainage ditches along highways throughout the gulf states. This provides a somewhat more sustainable, albeit less natural, habitat. However, even with the drainage ditch habitat, there is danger from DOT ROW spraying of miscellaneous herbicides, primarily growth-suppressants and broadleaf killers. S. rosea is appreciably more shade-tolerant than the other members of the genus.

== Botanical history ==
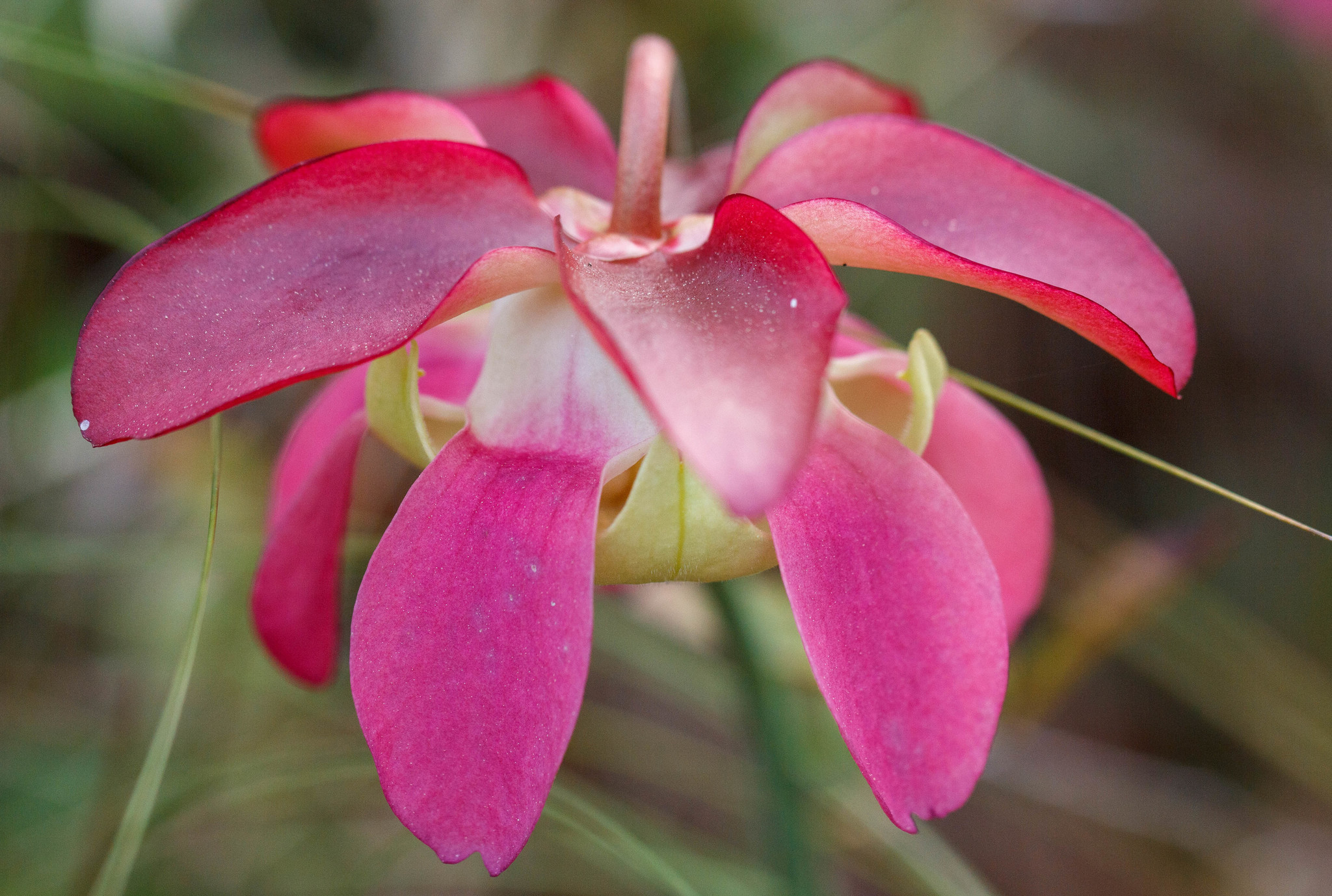
Flower, in Florida

Sarracenia rosea was first identified by the American botanist Edgar T. Wherry as a "mutant" form of S. purpurea in 1933 based on specimens collected by Frank Morton Jones in 1910 near Theodore, Alabama and Wherry's own collections in 1932, likely also from southern Alabama. These plants differed from S. purpurea in the rose-pink petals and nearly white style (S. purpurea has deep maroon petals and the style is typically green). Wherry sent specimens to Louis Burk, a Philadelphia horticulturalist, who confirmed Wherry's field observations in greenhouse-grown plants. Wherry followed this revelation and suggested naming the variety in honor of Burk, but it remained unpublished.

Based on the morphological differences from the southern subspecies, S. purpurea subsp. venosa, and the geographic isolation of the populations with pink petals along the Gulf Coast, the American botanist Donald E. Schnell formally described this taxon in a 1993 issue of Rhodora, the journal of the New England Botanical Club. Schnell decided to place this taxon at the rank of variety below subsp. venosa as S. purpurea var. burkii, honoring Louis Burk as Wherry had suggested 60 years earlier. In 1999, however, botanists Robert Naczi, then a professor of biology at Northern Kentucky University, and Frederick and Roberta Case described this plant as a new species, naming it Sarracenia rosea. They compiled morphological data from specimens of S. purpurea and S. rosea and found significant differences in scape height, petal size, pitcher "lip" thickness, and pitcher leaf morphology. All of this evidence, combined with the allopatric distribution that does not overlap with S. purpurea, lead the authors to determine the Gulf Coast populations with pink petals are worthy of recognition at species rank. They chose to assign a new epithet, rosea, to the species rather than utilize the varietal epithet burkii as allowed under article 11.2 of the International Code of Botanical Nomenclature to avoid confusion and express the color of the flowers in the species epithet.
