= Sutton Lake =

Sutton Lake may refer to:

- Sutton Lake (North Carolina), a lake on the Cape Fear River
- Sutton Lake (Oregon), a lake in Lane County, United States
- Sutton Lake (West Virginia), a reservoir in Braxton and Webster counties, United States
- Sutton Salt Lake, a lake in New Zealand's South Island
