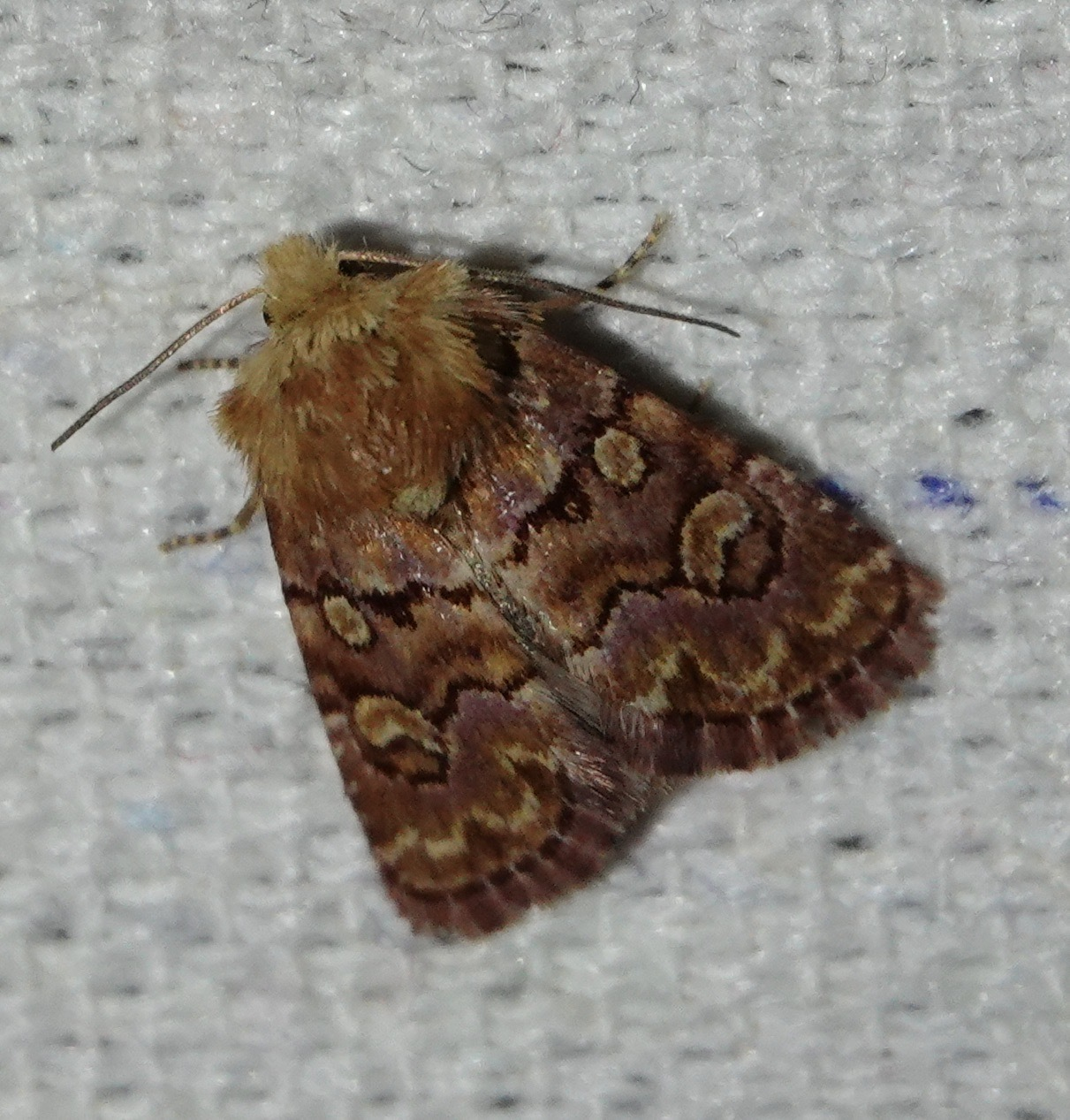
- Euros proprius

Scientific classification
- Domain: Eukaryota
- Kingdom: Animalia
- Phylum: Arthropoda
- Class: Insecta
- Order: Lepidoptera
- Superfamily: Noctuoidea
- Family: Noctuidae
- Subfamily: Noctuinae
- Genus: Euros; H. Edwards, 1881

Species
- Euros cervina (H. Edwards, 1890); Euros proprius H. Edwards, 1881; Euros osticollis Troubridge, 2006

Synonyms
- Protophana Hampson, [1906]

= Euros (moth) =

Genus of moths

Euros is a genus of moths of the family Noctuidae.
