= Euros osticollis =

Scientific classification
- Domain: Eukaryota
- Kingdom: Animalia
- Phylum: Arthropoda
- Class: Insecta
- Order: Lepidoptera
- Superfamily: Noctuoidea
- Family: Noctuidae
- Genus: Euros
- Species: E. osticollis

Binomial name
- Euros osticollis Troubridge, 2006

Species of moth

Euros osticollis is a moth of the family Noctuidae. It is found along streams and seeps in south-western Oregon.

The length of the forewings is 8–9 mm.

The larvae probably feed on Darlingtonia species.
