= Pitcher plant =

Carnivorous plants resembling pitchers

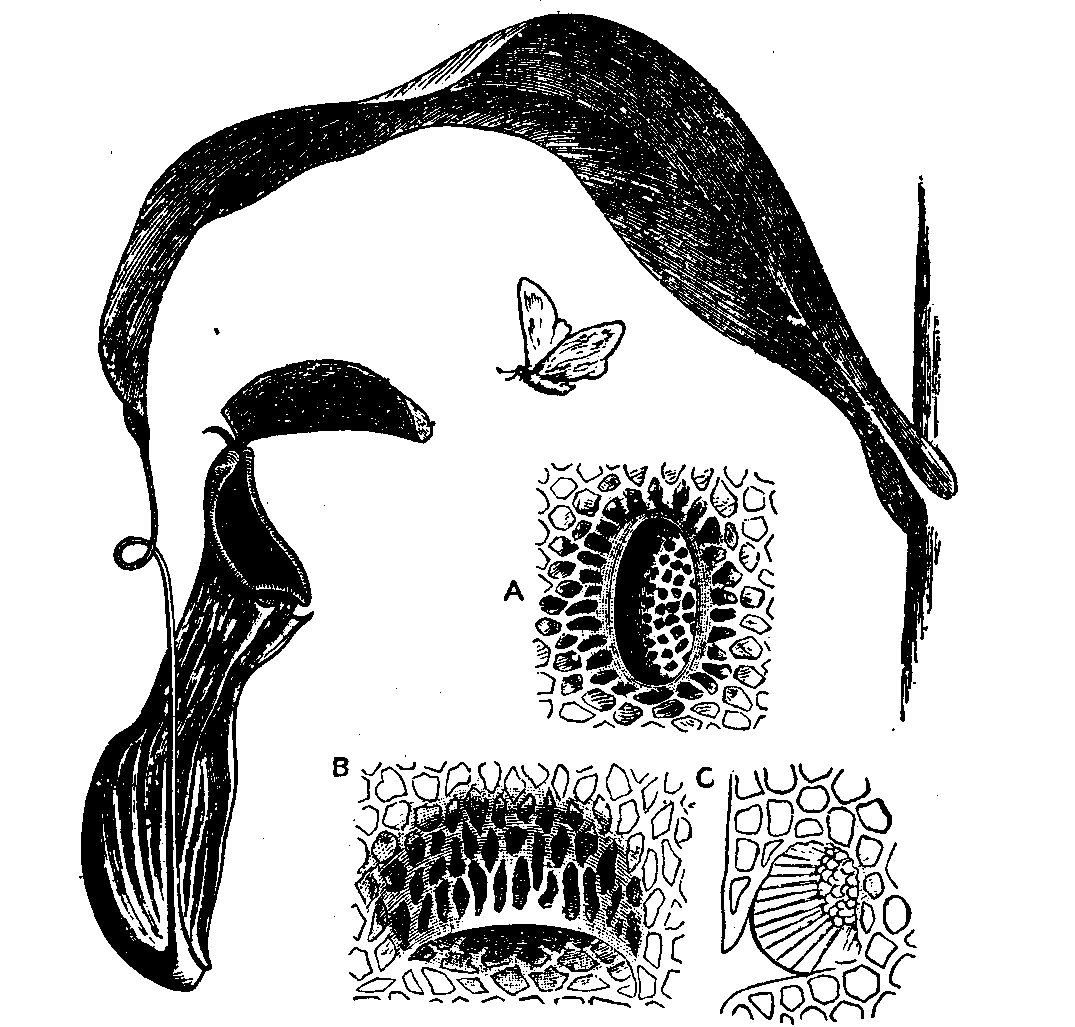
Pitcher of Nepenthes distillatoria. A: Honey-glands from attractive surface of lid. B: Digestive fluid from interior of pitcher, in pocket-like depression of epidermis, opening downwards. C: Transverse section of the same.

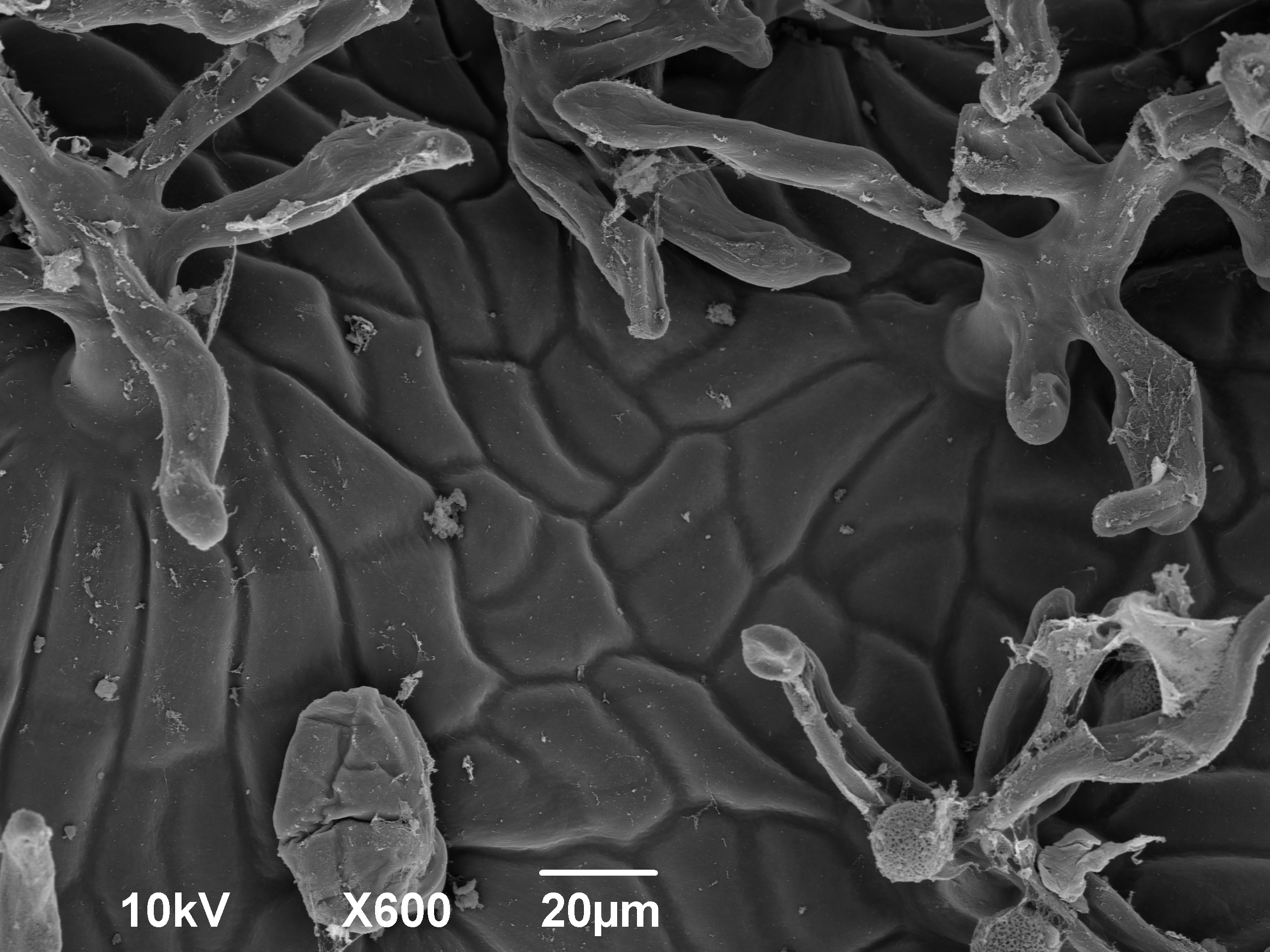
Scanning electron micrograph inner surface of pitcher plant

Pitcher plants growing in a bog in Pennsylvania

Pitcher plants are carnivorous plants that have modified leaves known as pitfall traps—prey-trapping mechanisms featuring a deep cavity filled with digestive liquid. The traps of what are considered to be "true" pitcher plants are formed by specialized leaves. The plants attract and drown the prey with nectar.

== Types ==
The term "pitcher plant" generally refers to members of the Nepenthaceae and Sarraceniaceae families, but similar pitfall traps are employed by the monotypic Cephalotaceae and some members of the Bromeliaceae. The families Nepenthaceae and Sarraceniaceae are the most species-rich families of pitcher plants.

=== Nepenthaceae ===
The Nepenthaceae contain a single genus, Nepenthes, containing over 100 species and numerous hybrids and cultivars. In this genus of Old World pitcher plants, the pitchers are borne at the end of tendrils that extend from the midrib of an otherwise unexceptional leaf. Old World pitcher plants are typically characterized as having reduced and symmetrical pitchers with a comprehensive waxy coating on the surface of the inner pitcher wall. The plants themselves are often climbers, accessing the canopy of their habitats using the aforementioned tendrils, although others are found on the ground in forest clearings, or as epiphytes on trees.

=== Sarraceniaceae ===
″The New World pitcher plants (Sarraceniaceae), which comprise three genera, are ground-dwelling herbs whose pitchers arise from a horizontal rhizome. In this family, the entire leaf forms the pitcher, as opposed to Nepenthaceae, where the pitcher arises from the terminal portion of the leaf. The species of the genus Heliamphora, which are popularly known as marsh pitchers (or erroneously as sun pitchers), have a simple rolled-leaf pitcher, at the tip of which is a spoon-like structure that secretes nectar. They are restricted to areas of high rainfall in South America. The North American genus Sarracenia are the trumpet pitchers, which have a more complex trap than Heliamphora, with an operculum, which prevents excess accumulation of rainwater in most of the species. The single species in the California genus Darlingtonia is popularly known as the cobra plant, due to its possession of an inflated "lid" with elegant false-exits, and a forked "tongue", which serves to ferry ants and other prey to the entrance of the pitcher. The species in Sarracenia readily hybridize, making their classification a complex matter.

The purple pitcher plant, Sarracenia purpurea, is the floral emblem of the province of Newfoundland and Labrador, Canada.

=== Cephalotaceae ===
The Cephalotaceae are a monotypic family with but one genus and species, Cephalotus follicularis. This species has a small (2–5 cm) pitcher similar in form to those of Nepenthes. Unlike in Nepenthes, in Cephalotus follicularis the petiole is attached to the rear of the upper trap rim rather than to the base of the pitcher. The species occurs in only one location in southwestern Australia.

=== Bromeliaceae ===
A few species of bromeliads (Bromeliaceae), such as Brocchinia reducta and Catopsis berteroniana, are known or suspected to be carnivorous.

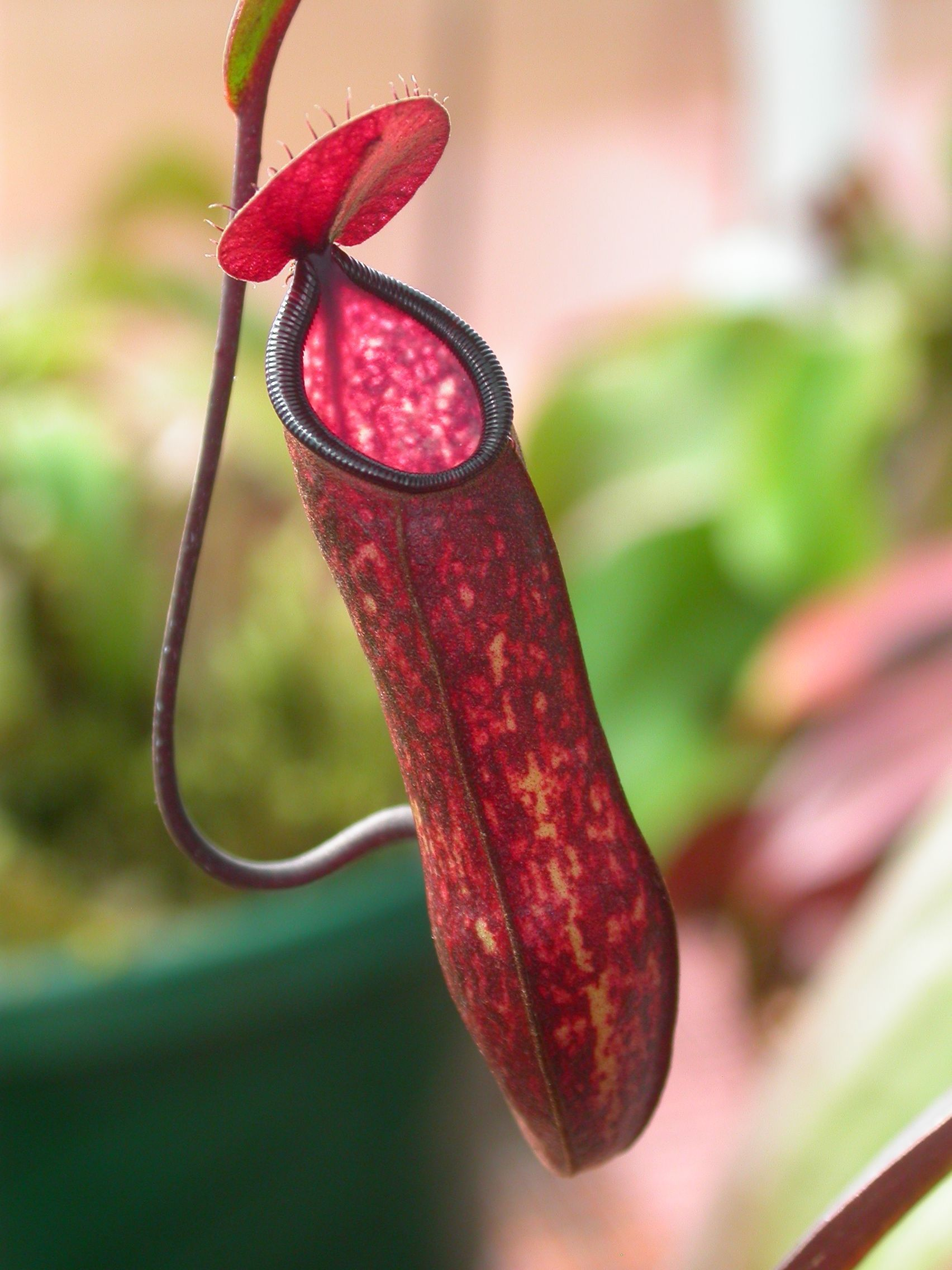
Nepenthes muluensis pitchers hang from tendrils. (This specimen is cultivated.)

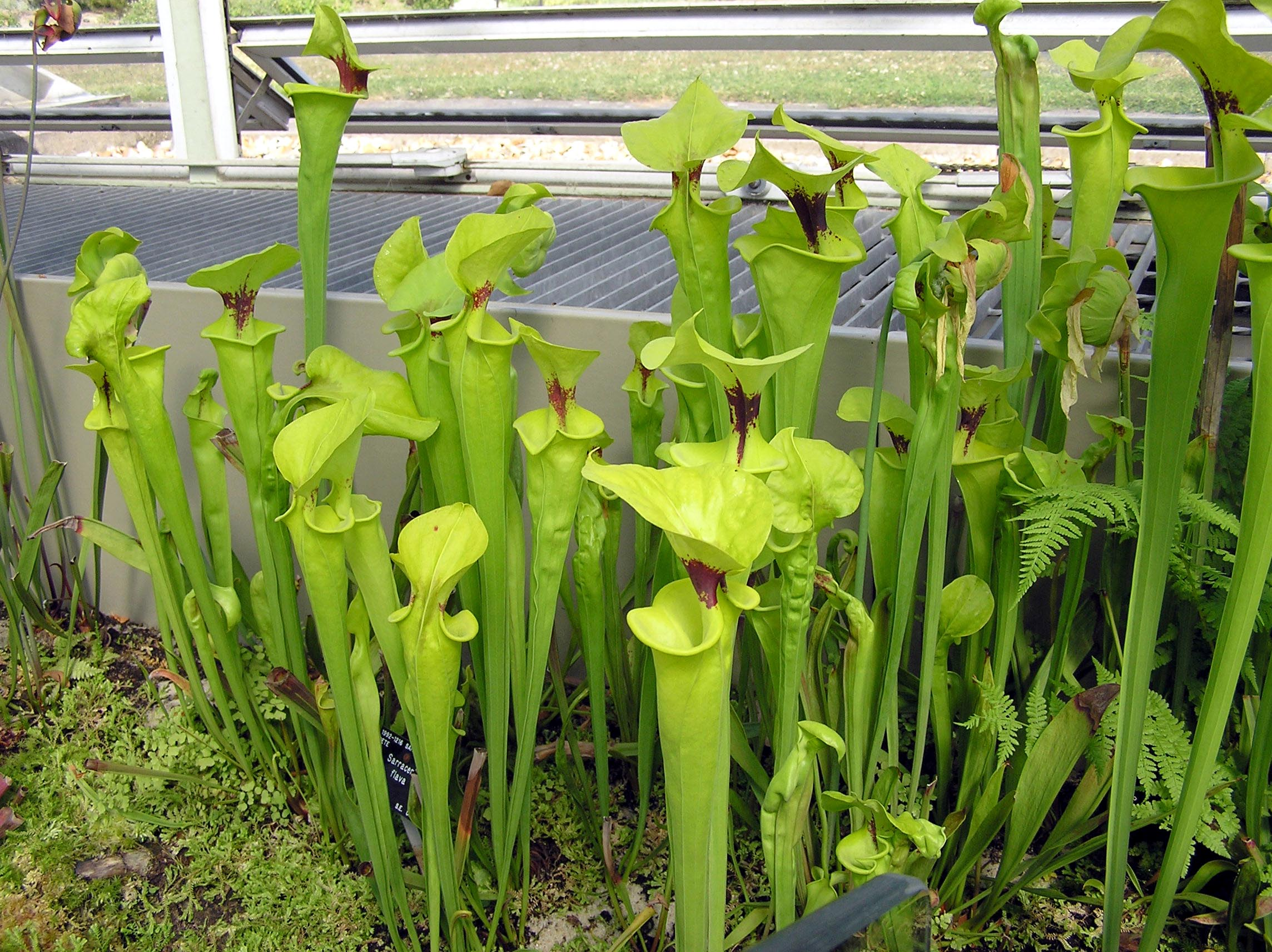
Most North American pitcher plants belong to the genus Sarracenia.

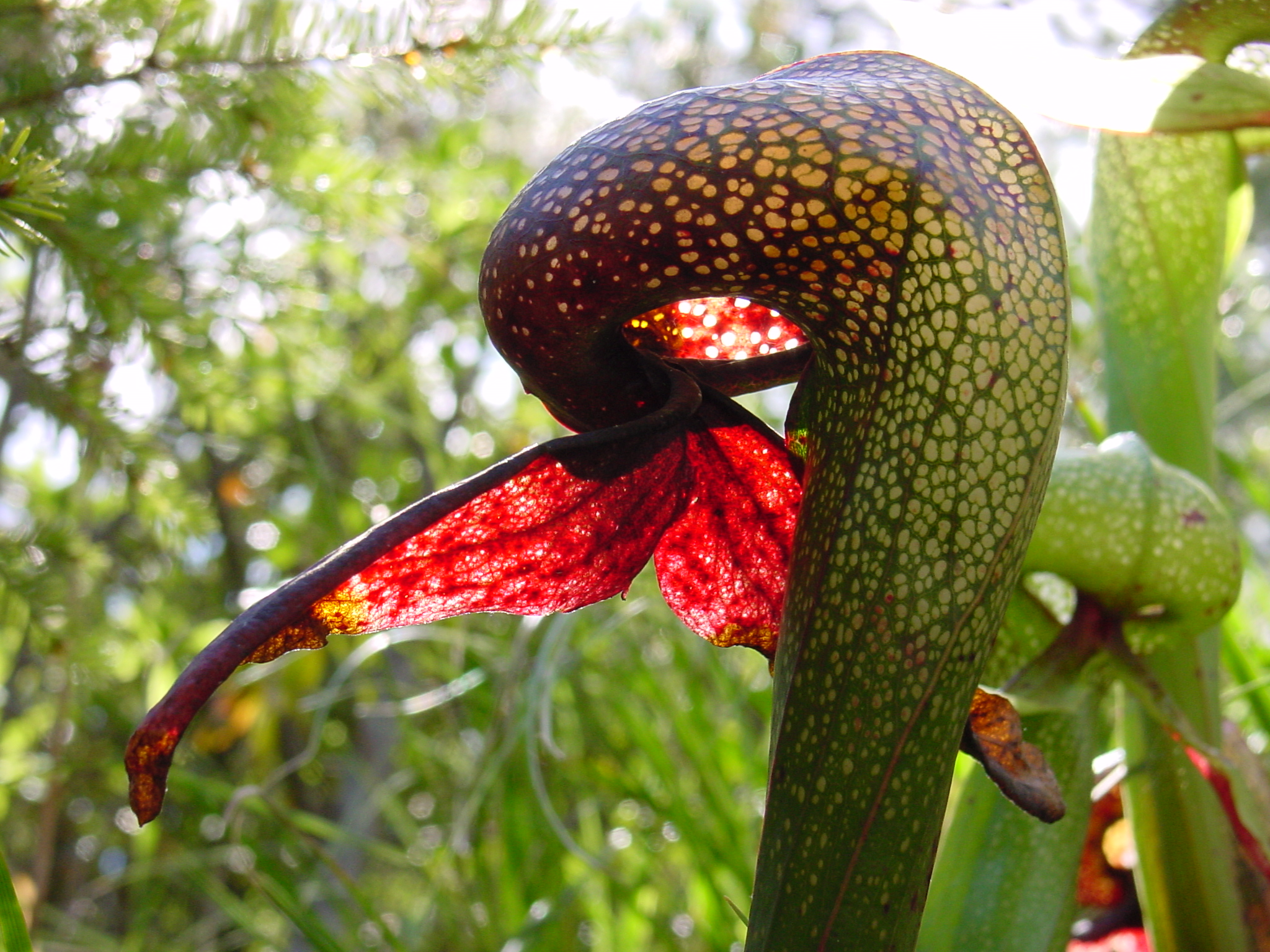
Cobra lilies (Darlingtonia californica) use window-like areolae to lure insects into their hollow leaves.

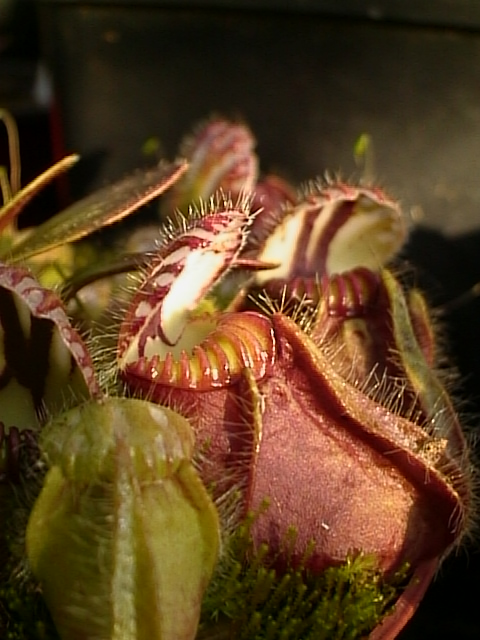
The Australian pitcher plant is the only member of the Australian genus Cephalotus.

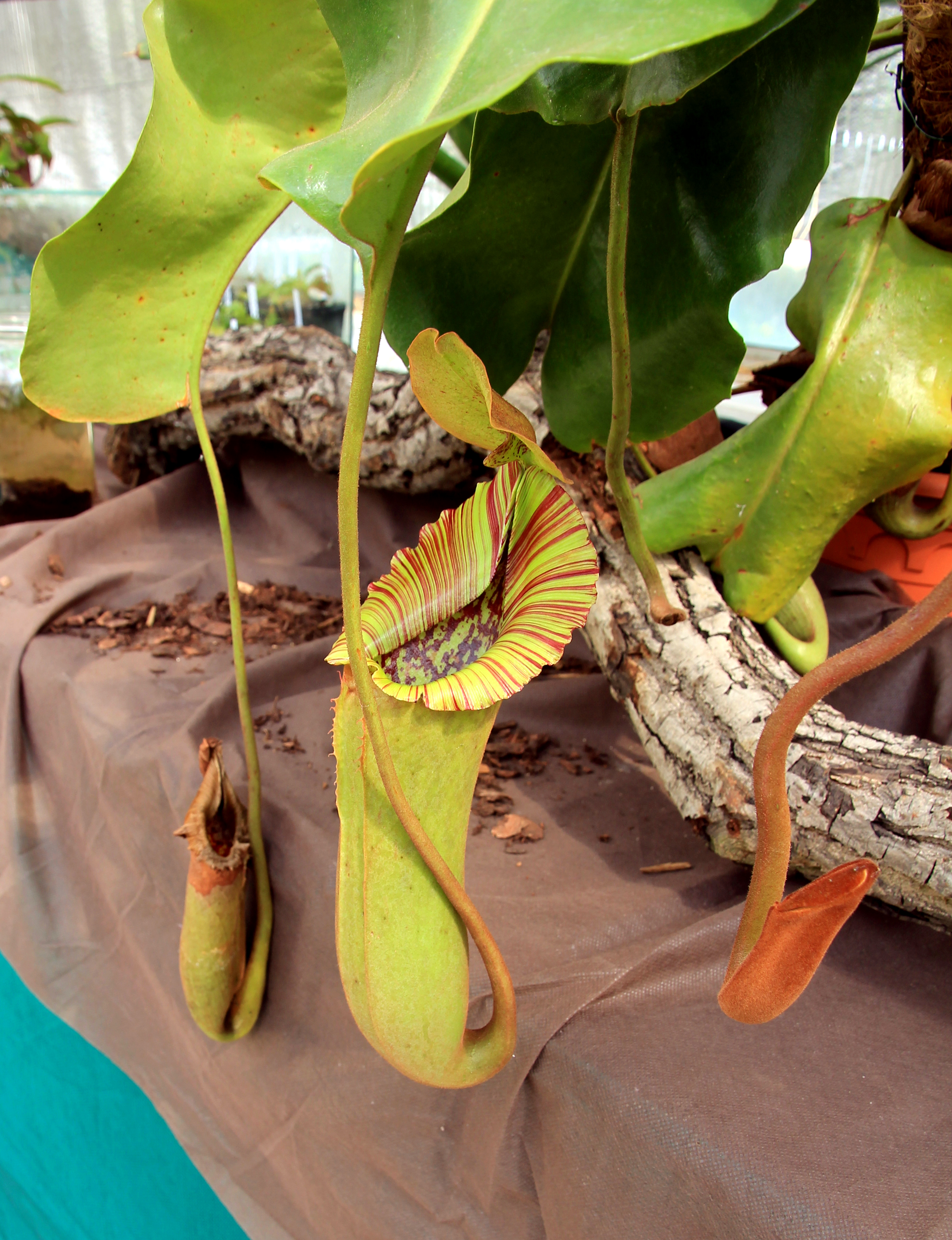
Nepenthes truncata

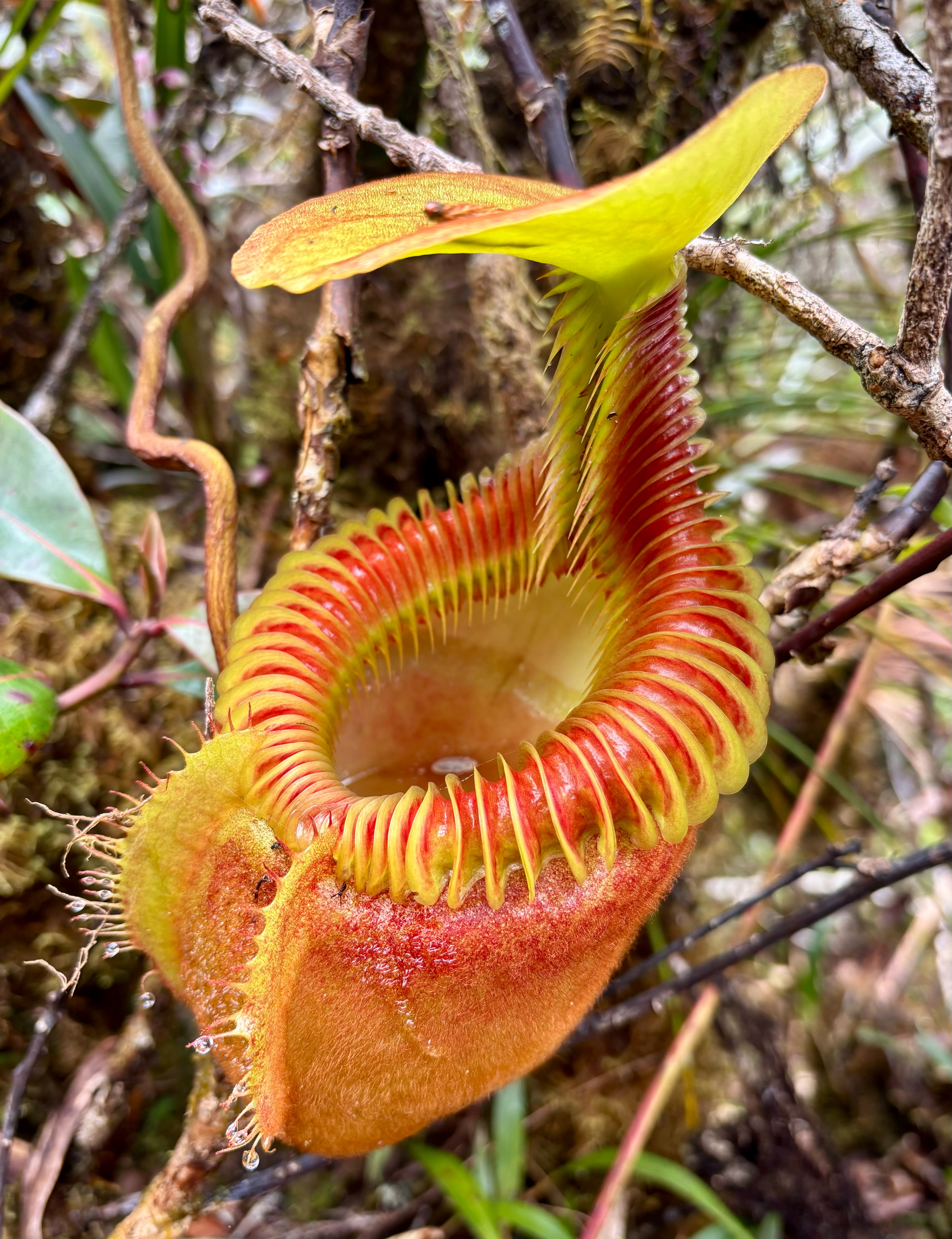
Pitcher of Nepenthes villosa

== Feeding behavior ==
=== Attraction ===
Foraging, flying, or crawling insects, such as flies, are attracted to a cavity formed by the cupped leaf, often by visual lures such as anthocyanin pigments, and nectar. Many pitcher plants exhibit patterns of ultraviolet coloration which may play a role in attracting insects. Some species, such as Cephalotus follicularis, likely use camouflage to trap insects, as their coloration matches that of the surrounding environment and the plants are often embedded in the substrate such that the traps are flush with the ground.

Olfactory cues can also play a role in attraction. For example, Nepenthes rafflesiana uses flower-scent mimicry to attract insects to its pitchers.

=== Capture ===
Bee gets stuck in the tube of the pitcher plant at Stanley Rehder Carnivorous Plant Garden in Wilmington, North Carolina

The rim of the pitcher (peristome) is slippery when moistened by condensation or nectar, causing insects to fall into the trap. The walls of the pitfall may be covered with waxy scales, protruding aldehyde crystals, cuticular folds, downward-pointing hairs, or guard-cell-originating lunate cells, to help prevent escape. The small bodies of liquid contained within the pitcher traps are called phytotelmata. They drown the insect, whose body is gradually dissolved. This may occur by bacterial action (the bacteria being washed into the pitcher by rainfall), or by digestive enzymes secreted by the plant itself. Pitcher trap fluids largely vary in their viscoelasticity and acidity, which dictates which type of prey they can target. For example, increased viscoelasticity is associated with increased insect retention to help capture flying insects such as flies, whereas increased fluid acidity can decrease insect killing-time, which can help capture crawling insects such as ants. Some pitcher plants contain mutualistic insect larvae, which feed on trapped prey, and whose excreta the plant absorbs.

=== Digestion ===
Whatever the mechanism of digestion, the prey items are converted into a solution of amino acids, peptides, phosphates, ammonium and urea, from which the plant obtains its mineral nutrition (particularly nitrogen and phosphorus). Like all carnivorous plants, pitcher plants all grow in locations where the soil is too poor in minerals and/or too acidic for most plants to survive. Pitcher plants supplement available nutrients and minerals (which plants normally obtain through their roots) with the constituents of their insect prey.

=== Feces-trapping symbiosis ===
Mature plants of Nepenthes lowii attract tree shrews (Tupaia montana), which feed on nectar that the plant produces but also defecate into the pitcher, providing nitrates and other nutrients. The plant and tree shrew have a mutualistic relationship. The rim of N. lowii is not slippery so that tree shrews can easily get in and out; it provides more nectar than other pitcher plants. The shape of the pitcher rim and the position of the nectar ensure that the animal's hindquarters are over the rim while it feeds.

Nepenthes rafflesiana var. elongata has a similar relationship with Hardwicke's woolly bats (Kerivoula hardwickii). The bats roost inside the pitchers and the plants derive much of their foliar nitrogen from the feces of the bats. Compared to other varieties of Nepenthes rafflesiana that do not exhibit this form of mutualism, N. rafflesiana var. elongata has elongated pitchers that can accommodate both single bats and mother-juvenile pairs. As well as its elongated shape, N. rafflesiana var. elongata has reduced volumes of pitcher fluid compared to other species, leaving more space to accommodate the bats.

== Evolution of the form ==
It is widely assumed pitfall traps evolved by epiascidiation (infolding of the leaf with the adaxial or upper surface becoming the inside of the pitcher), with selection pressure favouring more deeply cupped leaves over evolutionary time. The pitcher trap evolved independently in three eudicot lineages and one monocot lineage, representing a case of convergent evolution. Some pitcher plant families (such as Nepenthaceae) are placed within clades consisting mostly of flypaper traps, indicating that some pitchers may have evolved from the common ancestors of today's flypaper traps by loss of mucilage.

== See also ==
- Darlingtonia State Natural Site – A nature preserve for pitcher plants in Oregon, United States.
- Baghmara Pitcher Plant Wildlife Sanctuary
