= Euros cervina =

Scientific classification
- Domain: Eukaryota
- Kingdom: Animalia
- Phylum: Arthropoda
- Class: Insecta
- Order: Lepidoptera
- Superfamily: Noctuoidea
- Family: Noctuidae
- Genus: Euros
- Species: E. cervina

Binomial name
- Euros cervina (H. Edwards, 1890)

Synonyms
- Herrichia cervina H. Edwards, 1890

Species of moth

Euros cervina is a moth of the family Noctuidae described by Henry Edwards in 1890. It is found in riparian areas in the United States in western Oregon and northern California.

The length of the forewings is about 10 mm.
