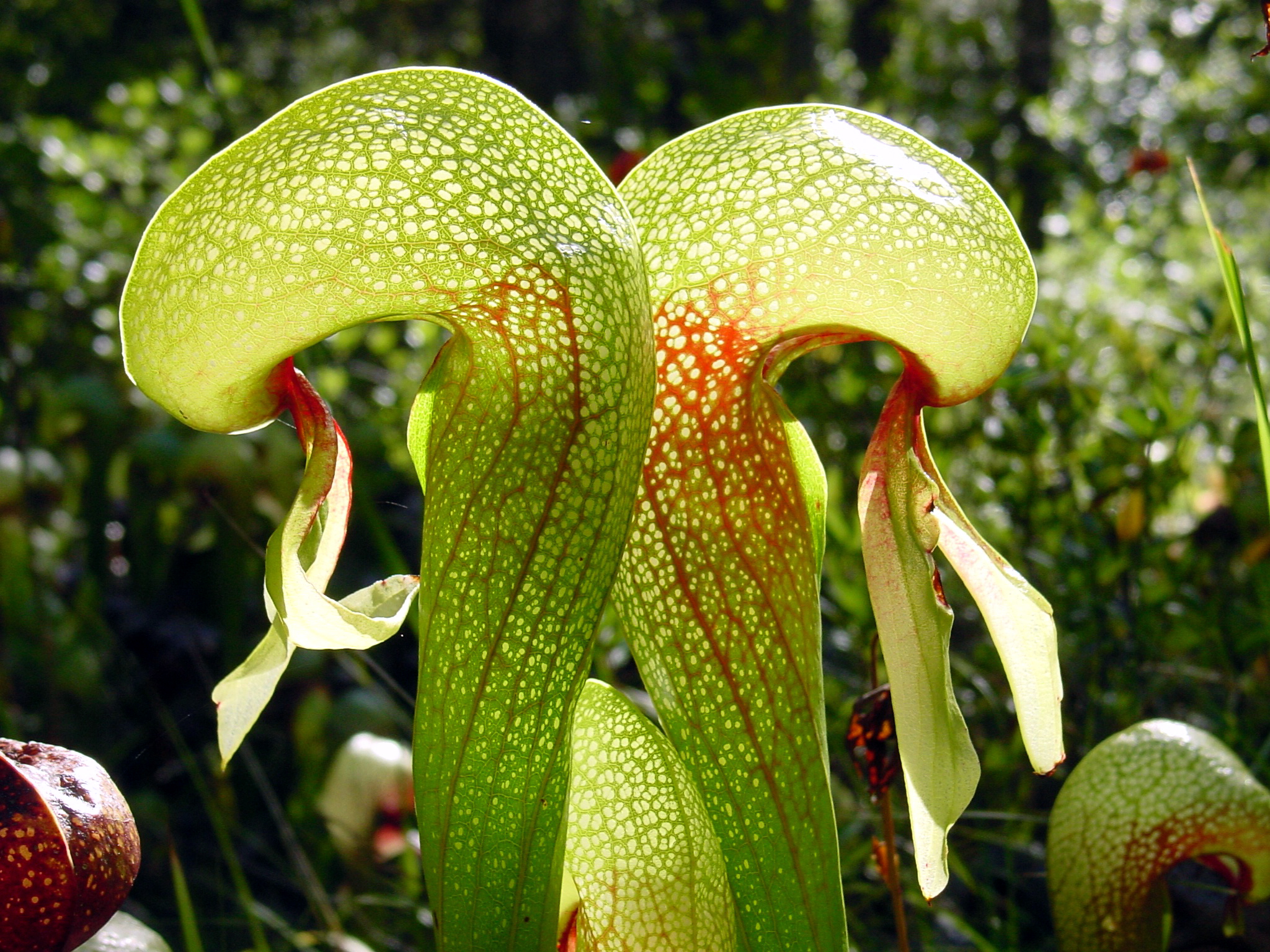
- Darlingtonia's translucent leaves confuse insects trying to escape.
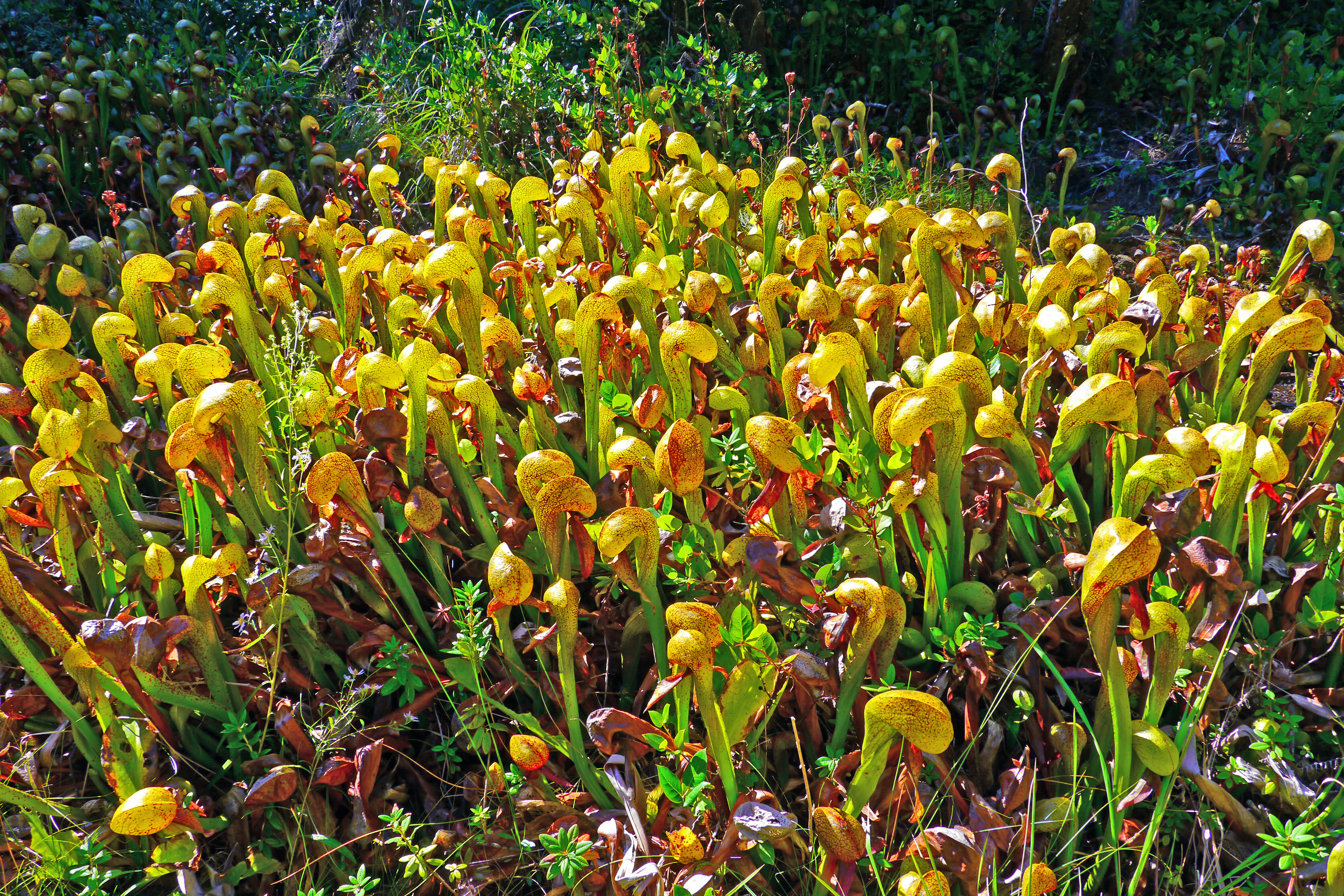
- Darlingtonia State Natural Site, Florence, Oregon.

Conservation status
- Least Concern (IUCN 2.3)

- Vulnerable (NatureServe)

Scientific classification
- Kingdom: Plantae
- Clade: Tracheophytes
- Clade: Angiosperms
- Clade: Eudicots
- Clade: Asterids
- Order: Ericales
- Family: Sarraceniaceae
- Genus: Darlingtonia; Torr. (1853)
- Species: D. californica

Binomial name
- Darlingtonia californica Torr.
- Darlingtonia distribution

Synonyms
- Chrysamphora californica (Torr.) Greene (1891)

= Darlingtonia californica =

Cobra lily

Species of carnivorous plant

Darlingtonia californica /dɑːrlɪŋˈtoʊniə kælɪˈfɔːrnɪkə/ is a species of carnivorous plant in the new world pitcher plant family, Sarraceniaceae. The cobra lily is the sole species within its monotypic genus, Darlingtonia.

The cobra lily is native to Northern California and southwest Oregon, up to Tillamook Co. on the coast of Oregon in the western United States. The climate in its habitats ranges from seacoast to near alpine, but is still Mediterranean (Koppen-Geiger Csb) with cool to cold temperatures and ample rain or snow in winter, and mild temperatures with little to no rain in summer. The cobra lily is restricted to perennial water flow of bogs, fens, and seeps. It has even been observed growing in perennial water flow (~seeps) of drainage ditches on the sides of roads. Like other carnivorous plants, cobra lily occurs on nutrient-poor substrates. It most commonly occurs on serpentine (ultramafic) rock, but also occurs on nutrient-poor silica sand deposits (Tertiary Gravel). Despite being fairly commonly cultivated, Darlingtonia is designated as uncommon due to its rarity in the field.

It is commonly called the cobra lily or cobra plant. The name "cobra lily" stems from the resemblance of its tubular leaves to a rearing cobra, complete with a forked leaf – ranging from yellow to purplish-green – that resemble fangs or a serpent's tongue. It is also called the California pitcher plant or Oregon pitcher plant, as well as the Cascadian pitcher plant by extension.

The plant was discovered during the Wilkes Expedition of 1841 by botanist William D. Brackenridge at Mount Shasta, Northern California. In 1853, it was described by John Torrey, naming the genus Darlingtonia after Philadelphian botanist William Darlington (1782–1863).

Cultivation in the UK has gained the plant the Royal Horticultural Society's Award of Garden Merit.

== Biology ==
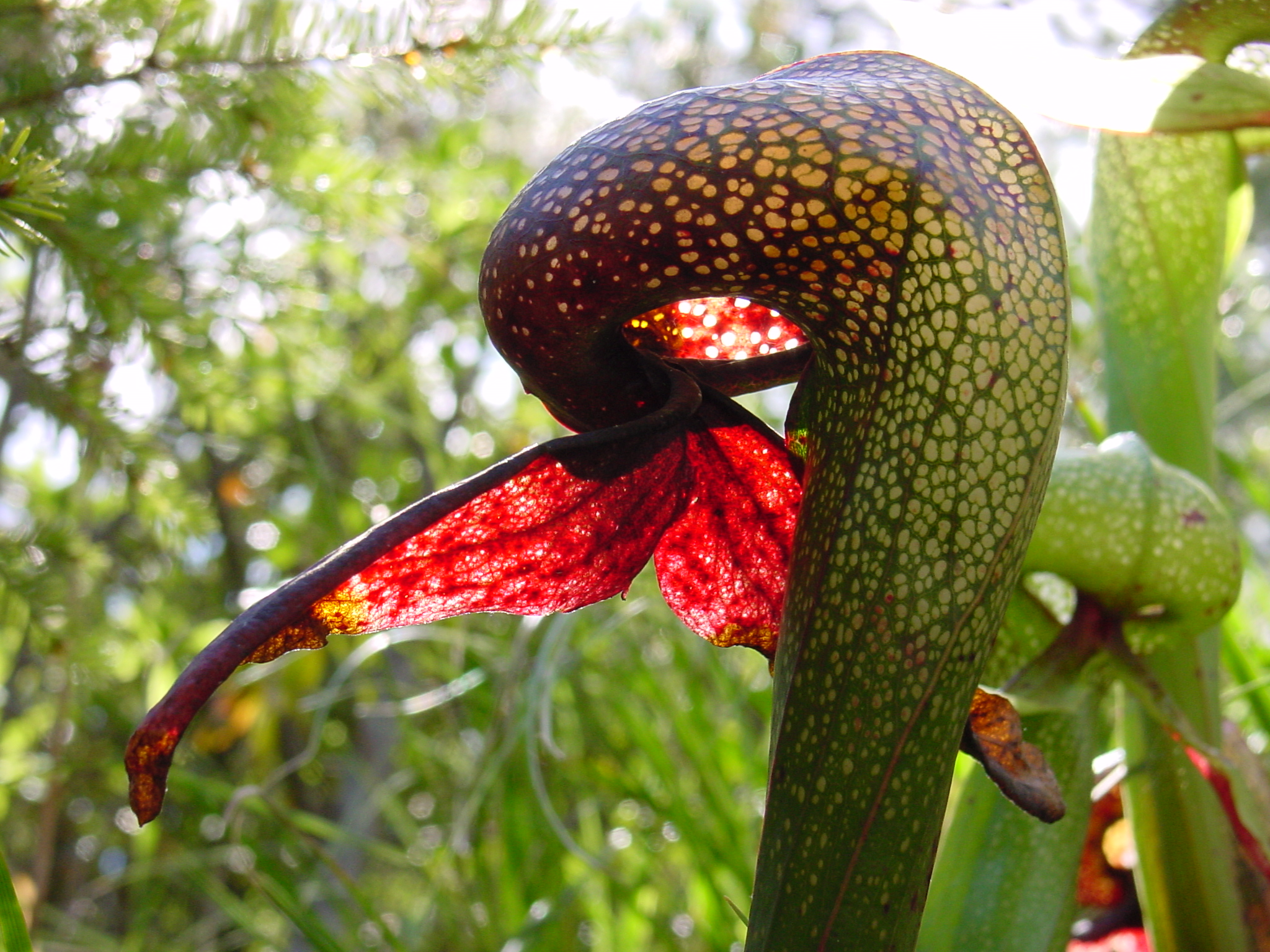
Showing the small entrance to the trap underneath the swollen 'balloon', and the colourless patches that confuse trapped prey

Darlingtonia in the wild growing near a cold stream in Trinity Alps Wilderness

The cobra plant is restricted to locations with perennial water flow including fens (bogs) and seeps. The species most commonly occurs on nutrient-poor rock types including serpentine (ultramafic), but always where there is perennial water flow. In common with most carnivorous plants, the cobra lily is adapted to supplementing its nitrogen requirements through carnivory, which helps to compensate for the lack of available nitrogen in such habitats.

=== Root system ===
Because many carnivorous species live in hostile environments, their root systems are commonly as highly modified as their leaves. Darlingtonia californica is no exception. The cobra lily has a very large and rambling root system when compared to those of other carnivorous plants in the family Sarraceniaceae. The cobra lily is able to survive fire by regenerating from its roots, but despite this important role the roots are very delicate organs. While the temperatures in much of the species's range can exceed 25 °C (77 °F), their roots die back after exposure to temperatures not much higher than 10 °C (50 °F) . Temperature plays a large part in the functioning of all plants, but it is very rare for individual organs to have such different temperature tolerances. The physiological mechanisms and evolutionary benefits of this discrepancy are not fully understood, however, in habitat the plants are normally found growing out of cold seeps, and this behavior would cause the plant to only expend energy growing roots in the direction of cold subsurface water sources. The reason for this extraordinary sensitivity of the roots to high temperatures is currently believed to be caused by a very low and limited optimal temperature of the ion pumps in root cells.

Modern cultivation efforts in breeding and selecting plants that can withstand higher temperatures without the roots dying back have met with significant success. As a result, there are several cultivars available as commercial house or garden plants which are more tolerant of higher temperatures. Many wild populations grow in serpentine (ultramafic) soils which are toxic to most green plants. Populations found growing on serpentine can withstand soil temperatures above 27 °C (80 °F) based on field studies of various cobra lily populations in Oregon, most of which are found growing on slopes composed of serpentine with cold subsurface water flow. The plants can suffer from root rot in cultivation if grown in stagnant, standing water and tend to thrive in areas where cold subsurface water slowly flows underground around their roots. It is not currently understood why the plants can withstand higher soil temperatures when found growing on serpentine soils.

=== Pitcher mechanisms ===
The cobra lily is unique among the three genera of American pitcher plants. It does not trap rainwater in its pitcher. Instead, it regulates the level of water inside physiologically by secreting water into the leaf trap that has been taken up from the roots. It was once believed that this species of pitcher plant did not produce any digestive enzymes and relied on symbiotic bacteria and protozoa to break down the captured insects into easily absorbed nutrients. However, recent studies have indicated that Darlingtonia secretes at least one proteolytic enzyme that digests captured prey. The cells that absorb nutrients from the inside of the pitcher are the same as those on the roots that absorb soil nutrients. The efficiency of the plant's trapping ability is attested to by its leaves and pitchers, which are, more often than not, full of insects and their remains.

The slippery walls and hairs of the pitcher tube prevent trapped prey from escaping. In addition to the lubricating secretions and downward-pointing hairs common to all North American pitcher plants to force their prey into the trap, this species uses its curled operculum (hood) to hide the tiny exit hole from trapped insects and offers multiple translucent false exits. Upon trying many times to escape via the false exits, the insect will tire and fall down into the trap. Other species that use a low-hanging hood to hide the exit hole include the parrot pitcher plant, Sarracenia psittacina and the hooded pitcher plant, Sarracenia minor. S. psittacina also forms a curled operculum, while S. minor uses a leaf that is folded over the entrance. A misconception about Darlingtonia is that its forked tongue is an adaption to trap insects. However, a study done by American Journal of Botany determined that removal of the tongue does not affect prey biomass.

=== Pollination ===
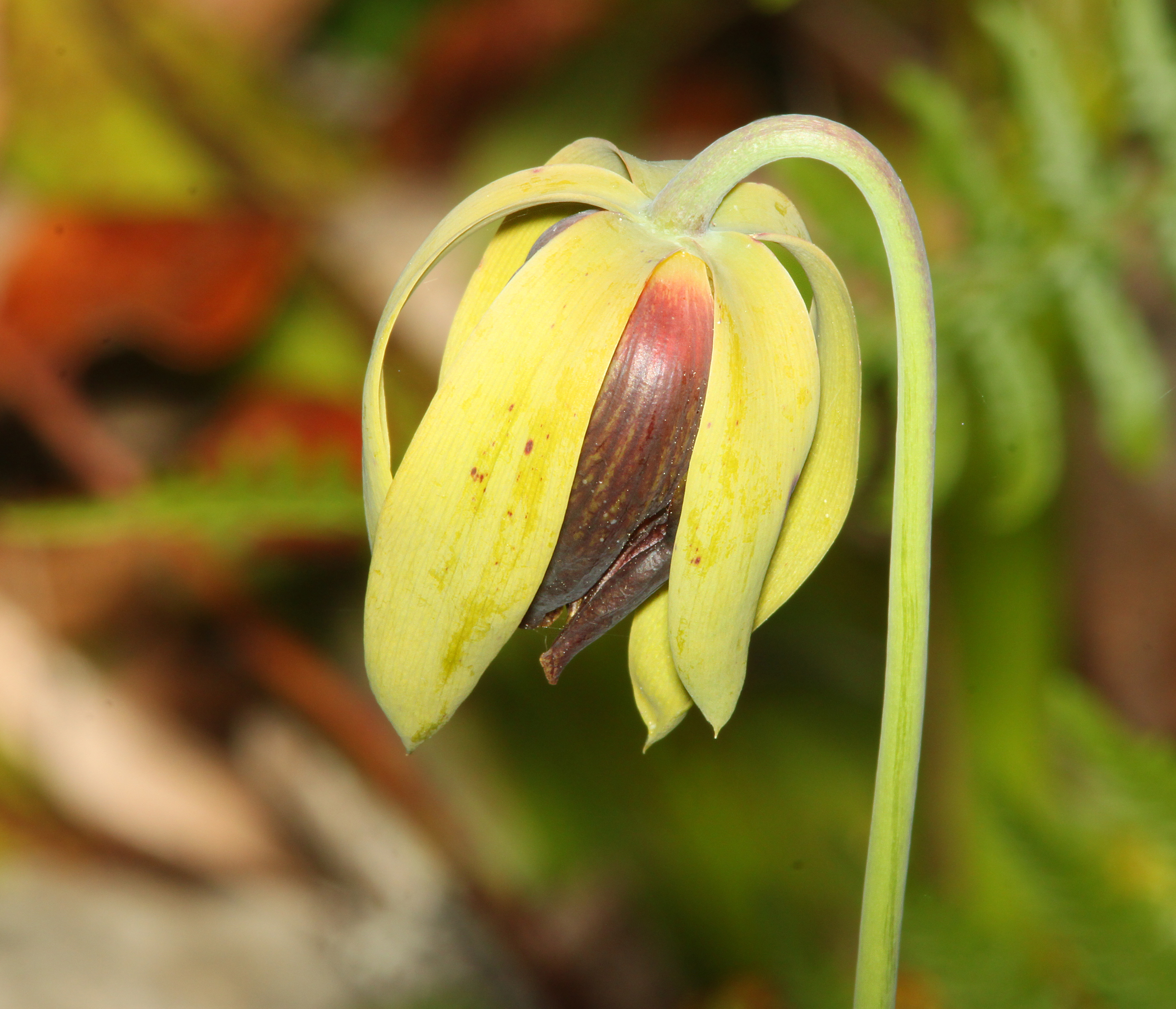
Flower

A remaining mystery surrounding the cobra lily is its means of pollination. Its flower is unusually shaped and complex, typically a sign of a close pollinator-plant specialization. The flower is yellowish purple in color and grows on a stalk which is slightly taller than the pitcher leaves. It has five sepals, green in color, which are longer than the red-veined petals. It is generally expected that the pollinator is either a fly or bee attracted to the flower's unpleasant smell or some nocturnal insect.

A 2011 study suggests that it may be melittophilous after observing a miner bee species (Andrena nigrihirta). Pollinating by hand yielded poor results, therefore, melittophilous seems likely considering the complexity of the fruit. According to the study, "Observations of A. nigrihirta on flowers revealed that the shape and orientation of D. californica's ovary and petals promote stigma contact both when pollinators enter and exit a flower, contrary to previous thought. Our findings provide evidence that D. californica is melittophilous". Furthermore, Darlingtonia was pollen-limited in all five plants observed. However, in the case of male absence, Darlingtonia was still able to reproduce suggesting that self pollination may play a role as well. It seems likely that both occur and only bolsters the reputation of hardiness in the wild.

== Infraspecific taxa ==
Two infraspecific taxa are recognized:

- D. californica f. californica (autonym)
- D. californica f. viridiflora B.Rice

== Cultivation ==
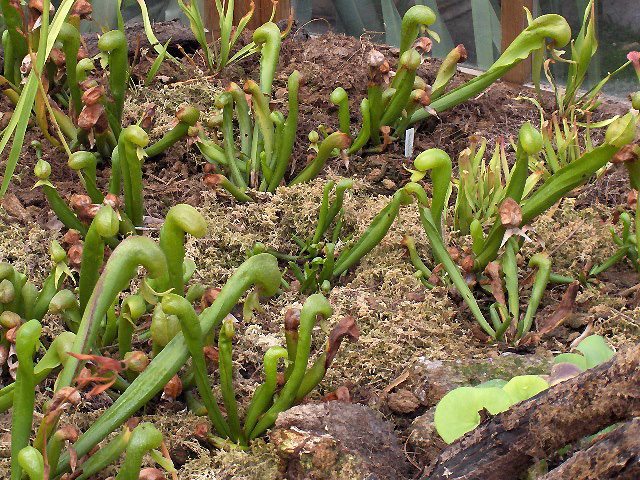
Plants in cultivation

Darlingtonia californica can be a difficult carnivorous plant to keep in cultivation, as they require specific environmental conditions. They prefer cool to warm day-time temperatures and cold or cool night-time temperatures. Cobra lilies typically grow in bogs or streambanks that are fed by cold mountain water, and grow best when the roots are kept cooler than the rest of the plant. It is best to mimic these conditions in cultivation, and water the plants with cold, purified water. On hot days, it helps to place ice cubes of purified water on the soil surface. They prefer sunny conditions if in a humid, warm location, and prefer part-shade if humidity is low or fluctuates often. Plants can adapt to low humidity conditions, but optimum growth occurs under reasonable humidity.

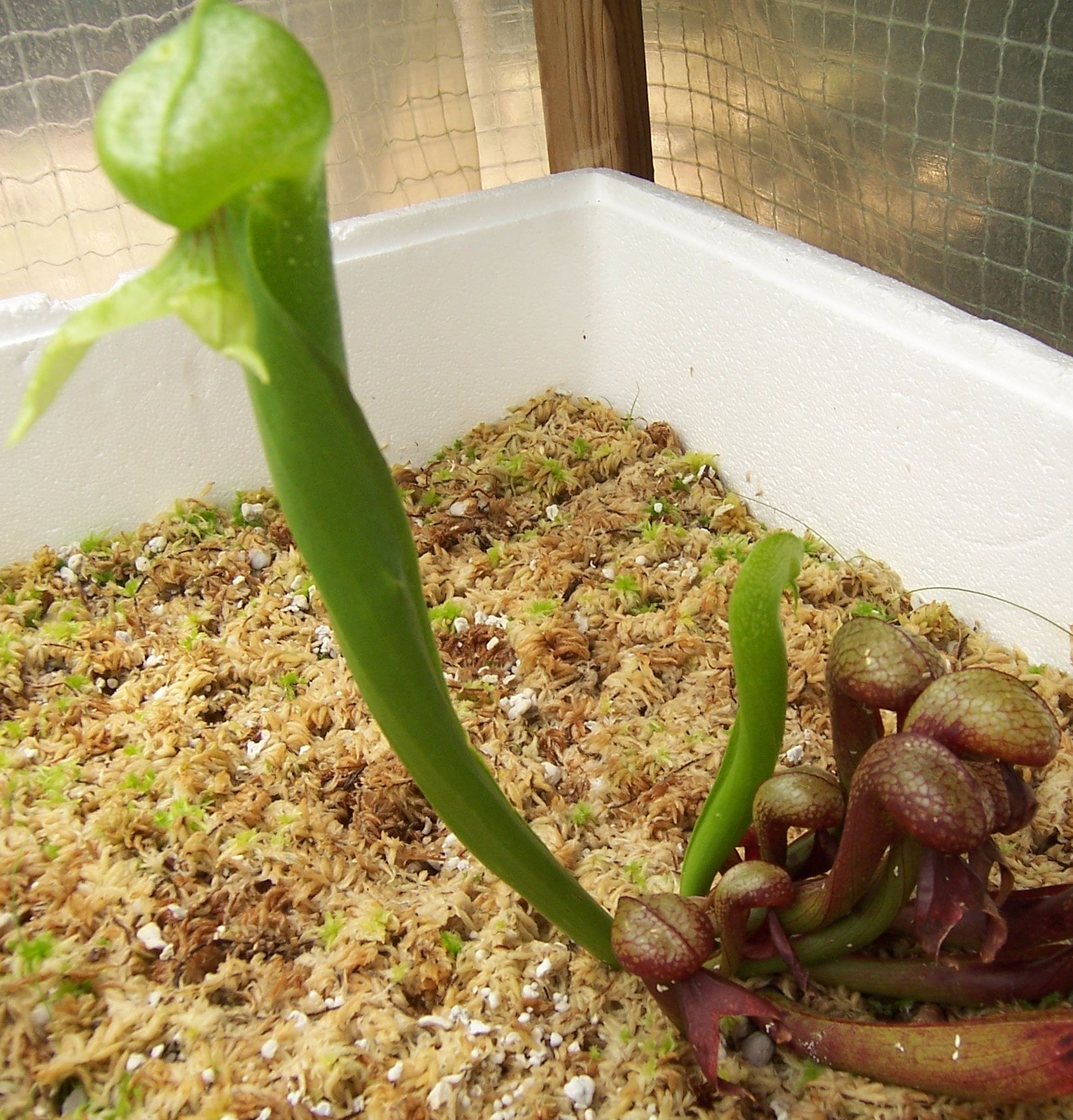
A single plant in cultivation, clearly showing the first pitcher of the season. The first few pitchers at the beginning of each growing season are much larger than the others.

Growing the plants in styrofoam ice coolers with sphagnum moss is a reliable method used by many commercial growers of Darlingtonia to prevent root loss caused by high soil temperatures during the warmer parts of the year. This method keeps the roots of the plants cool, and prevents the temperature sensitive roots from dying back.

Growing cobra lilies from seed is extremely slow and cobra seedlings are difficult to maintain, so these plants are best propagated from the long stolons they grow in late winter and spring. When a minute cobra plant is visible at the end of the stolon (usually in mid to late spring), the whole stolon may be cut into sections a few inches long, each with a few roots attached. Lay these upon cool, moist, shredded long-fibered sphagnum moss and place in a humid location with bright light. In many weeks, cobra plants will protrude from each section of stolon.

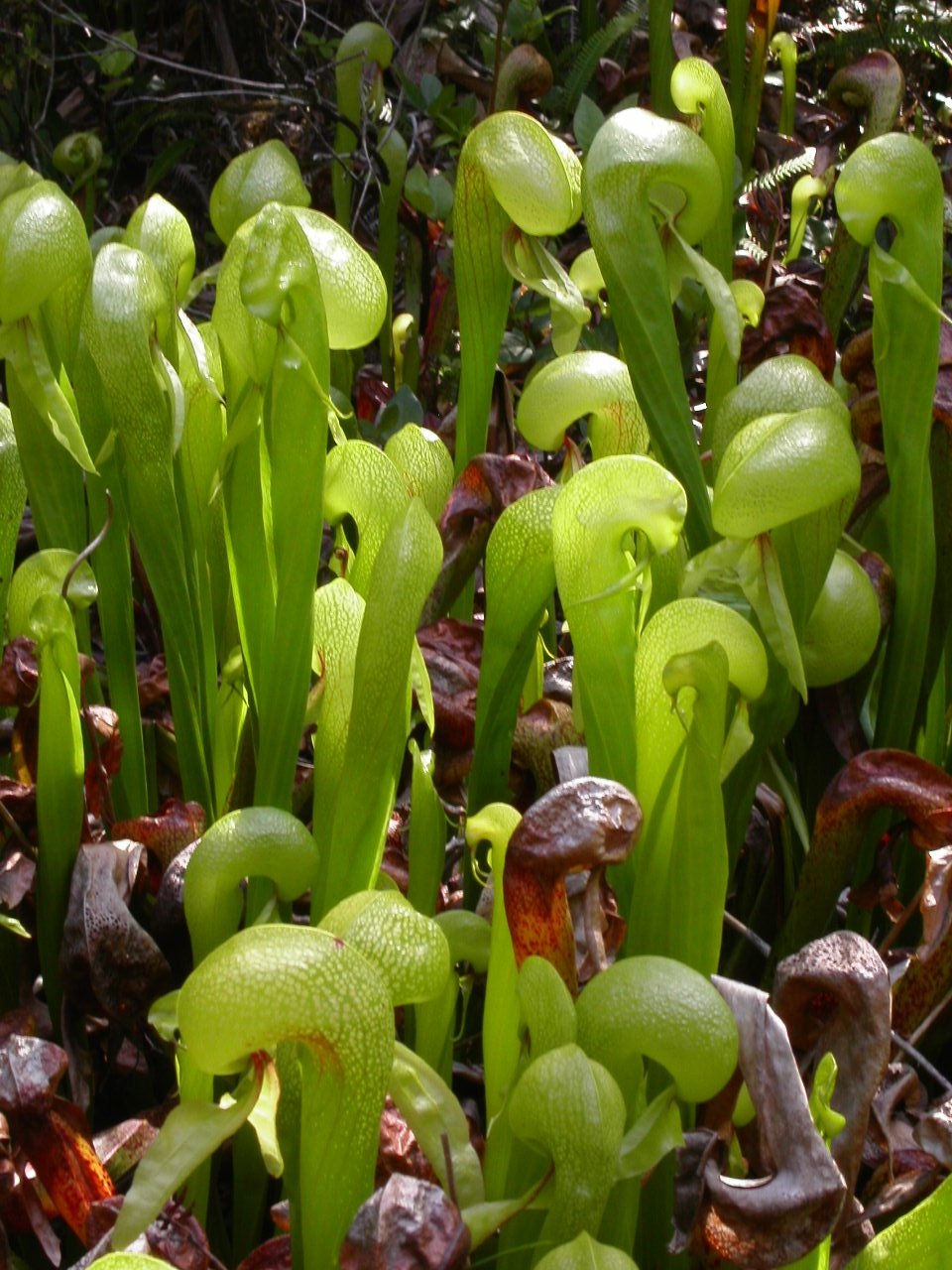
Northernmost natural population

Like many other carnivorous plants of temperate regions, cobra lilies require a cold winter dormancy in order to live long-term. Plants die down to their rhizomes in frigid winters and will maintain their leaves in cool winters during their dormancy period. This period lasts from 3 to 5 months during the year, and all growth stops. As spring approaches, mature plants may send up a single, nodding flower, and a few weeks later the plant will send up a few large pitchers. The plant will continue to produce pitchers throughout the summer, however much smaller than the early spring pitchers.

Many carnivorous plant enthusiasts have succeeded in cultivating these plants, and have developed or discovered three color morphs: all green, all red, and red-green bicolor.

Wild-type plants are all green in moderate light and bicolor in intense sunlight.

== See also ==
- Darlingtonia Botanical Wayside, Florence, Oregon
