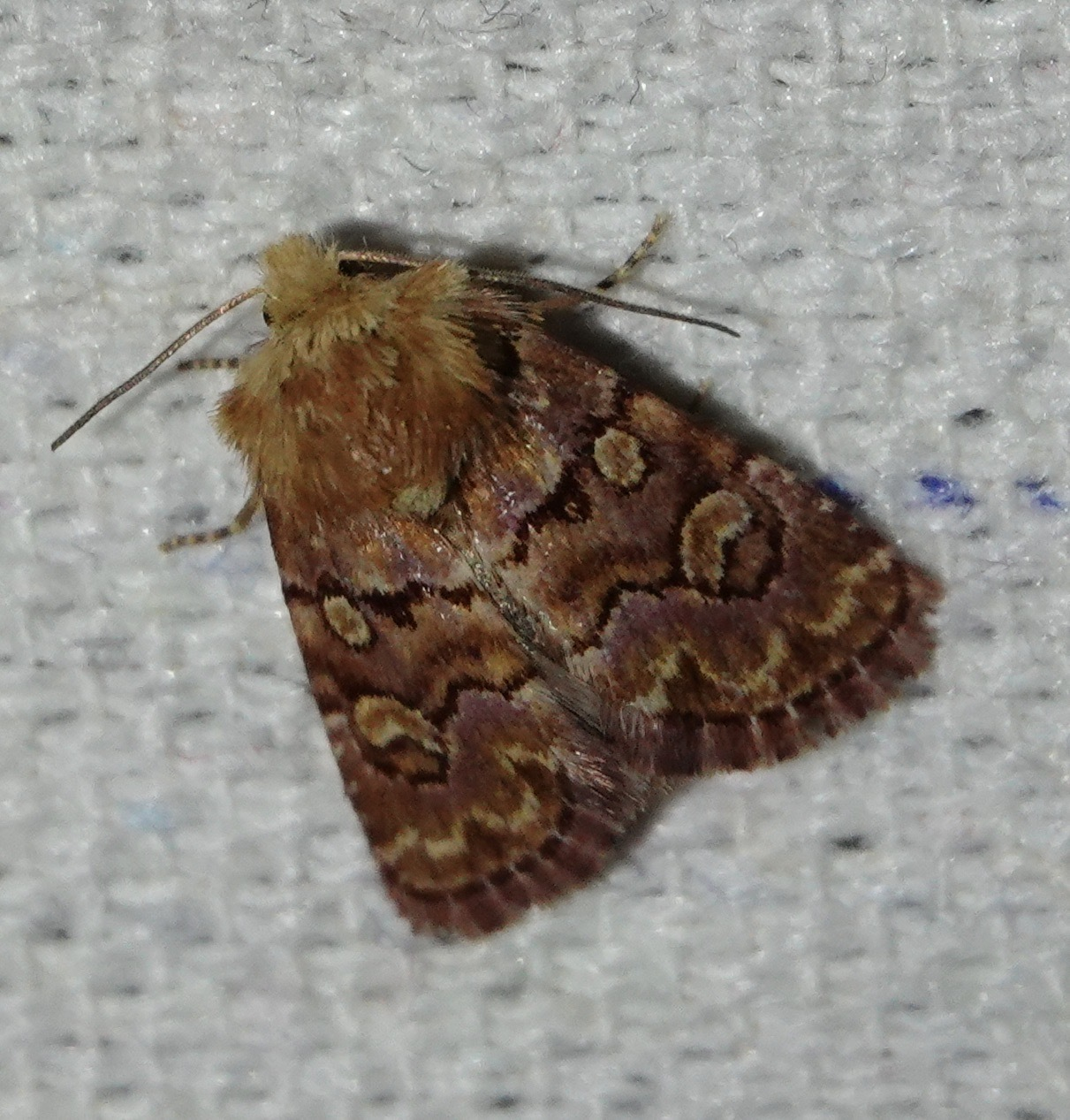
- Euros proprius

Scientific classification
- Domain: Eukaryota
- Kingdom: Animalia
- Phylum: Arthropoda
- Class: Insecta
- Order: Lepidoptera
- Superfamily: Noctuoidea
- Family: Noctuidae
- Genus: Euros
- Species: E. proprius

Binomial name
- Euros proprius H. Edwards, 1881

= Euros proprius =

Species of moth

Euros proprius is a moth of the family Noctuidae described by Henry Edwards in 1881. Euros proprius is the most distinctive species in the Euros genus. It is found near streams in dry forests in the northern Sierra Nevada in the US state of California.

The length of the forewings is 9–10 mm.

The larvae feed on Paeonia brownii.
