= Darlingtonia State Natural Site =

Botanical preserve in Oregon

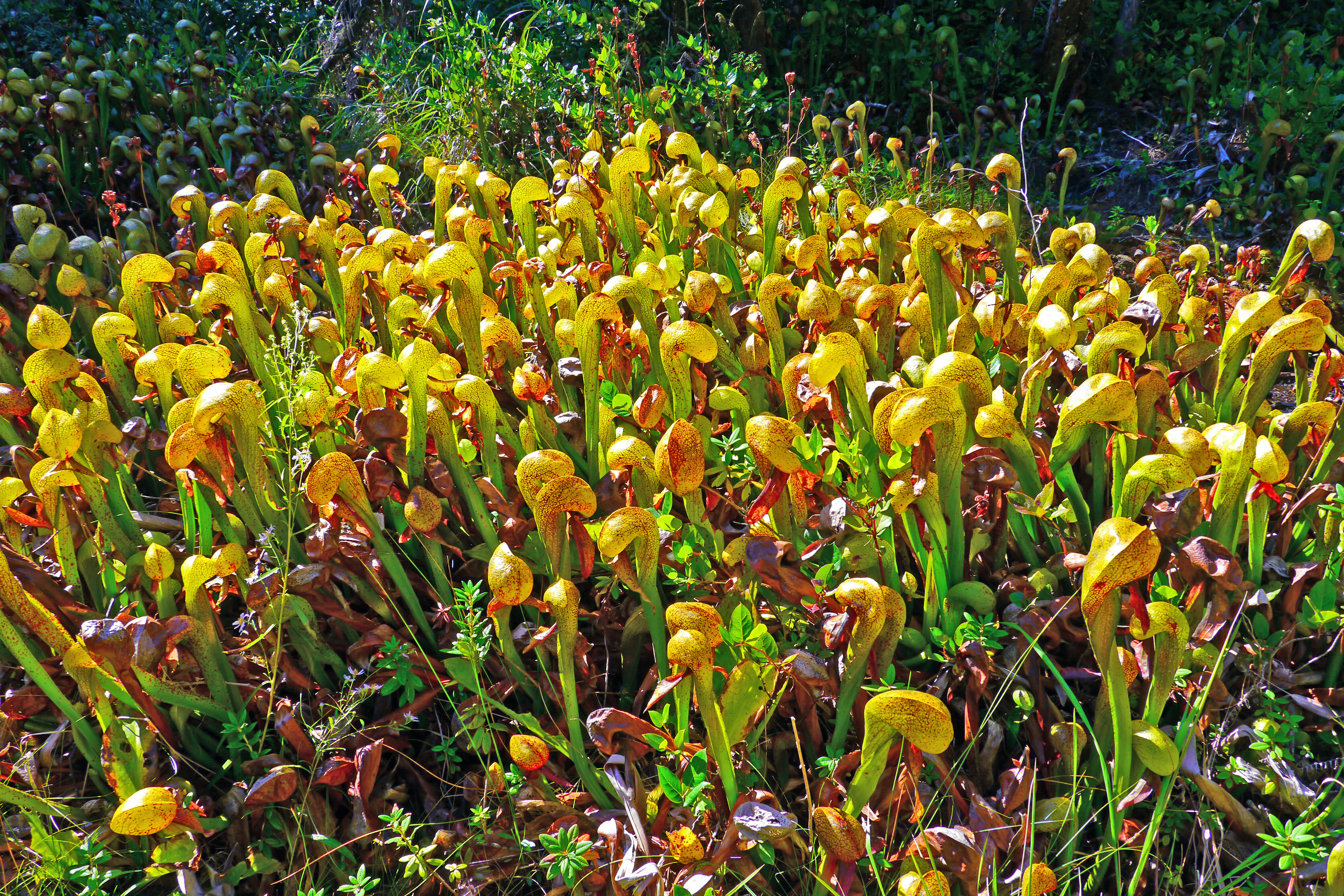
- D. californica at the site

- Location within Oregon Location within the United States
- Interactive map of Darlingtonia State Natural Site
- Type: Public, state
- Location: Lane County, Oregon
- Nearest city: Florence
- Coordinates: 44°02′45″N 124°05′46″W
- Area: 18 acres (7.3 ha)
- Operator: Oregon Parks and Recreation Department

Darlingtonia State Natural Site (18 acres) is a state park and botanical preserve located five miles (8.0 km) north of Florence, Oregon, United States on U.S. Route 101, just west of Mercer Lake and south of Sutton Lake that is dedicated to the preservation of a rare plant.

Darlingtonia californica is a carnivorous plant (commonly known as the cobra lily or western pitcher plant), luring and trapping insects to its hollow, vertical pitchers (leaves) with a sweet, sticky secretion. In addition to the aroma, the top of the pitcher is red and attracts specific insects by the bright color. This part of the plant is also flared into a hollow "dome" with a forked "tongue" shape, giving the appearance of a cobra rearing-up in defense, and earning the species its common name. In late spring, they bear purple and yellow flowers that rise about 12" above the plants themselves. Darlingtonia are found only in moist meadows and bogs with acidic soils low in nitrogen, though they have been sighted in drainage ditches, near creeks. and even on the sides of freeways, growing in moist zones. The rare, uniquely-formed cobra lily is the only member of its genus, Darlingtonia, and the only pitcher plant family member, the Sarraceniaceae, to be found in Oregon.

The park has a short loop trail through a peat bog area overlooking the patches of Darlingtonia. It is the only Oregon state park dedicated to the protection of a single plant species.

== See also ==
- List of botanical gardens in the United States
- List of Oregon State Parks
