= Sutton Lake (Oregon) =

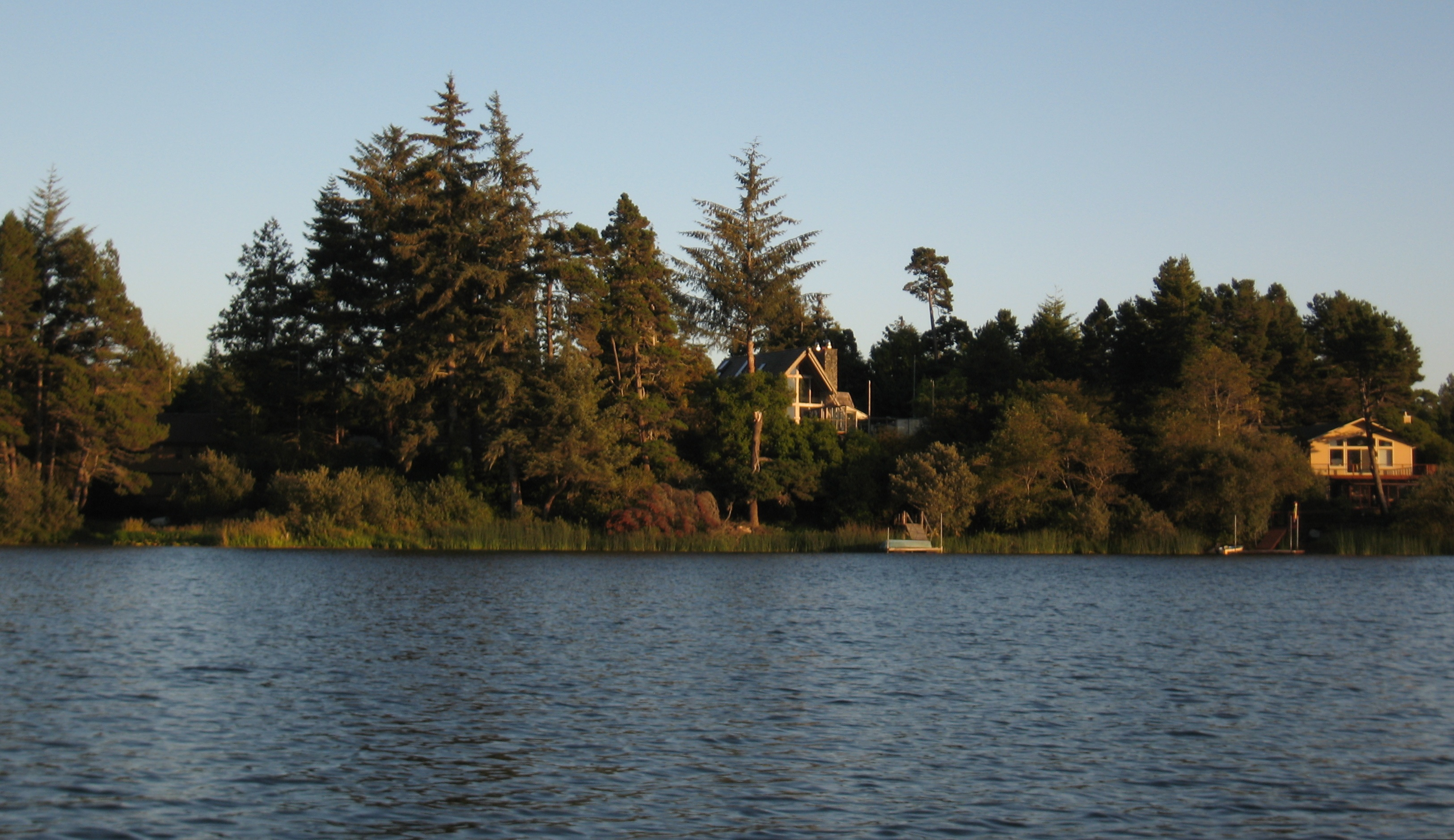

- Location within Oregon Location within the United States
- Location: Lane County, Oregon
- Coordinates: 44°03′26″N 124°05′33″W
- Type: lake
- Basin countries: United States
- Surface elevation: 33 ft (10 m)

Sutton Lake is a lake in Lane County, Oregon, in the United States.

Sutton Lake was named for Orrin W. Sutton, a pioneer who settled there.

== See also ==
- List of lakes in Oregon
